= New Enlightenment (China) =

Chinese social and cultural movement (1978–1989)

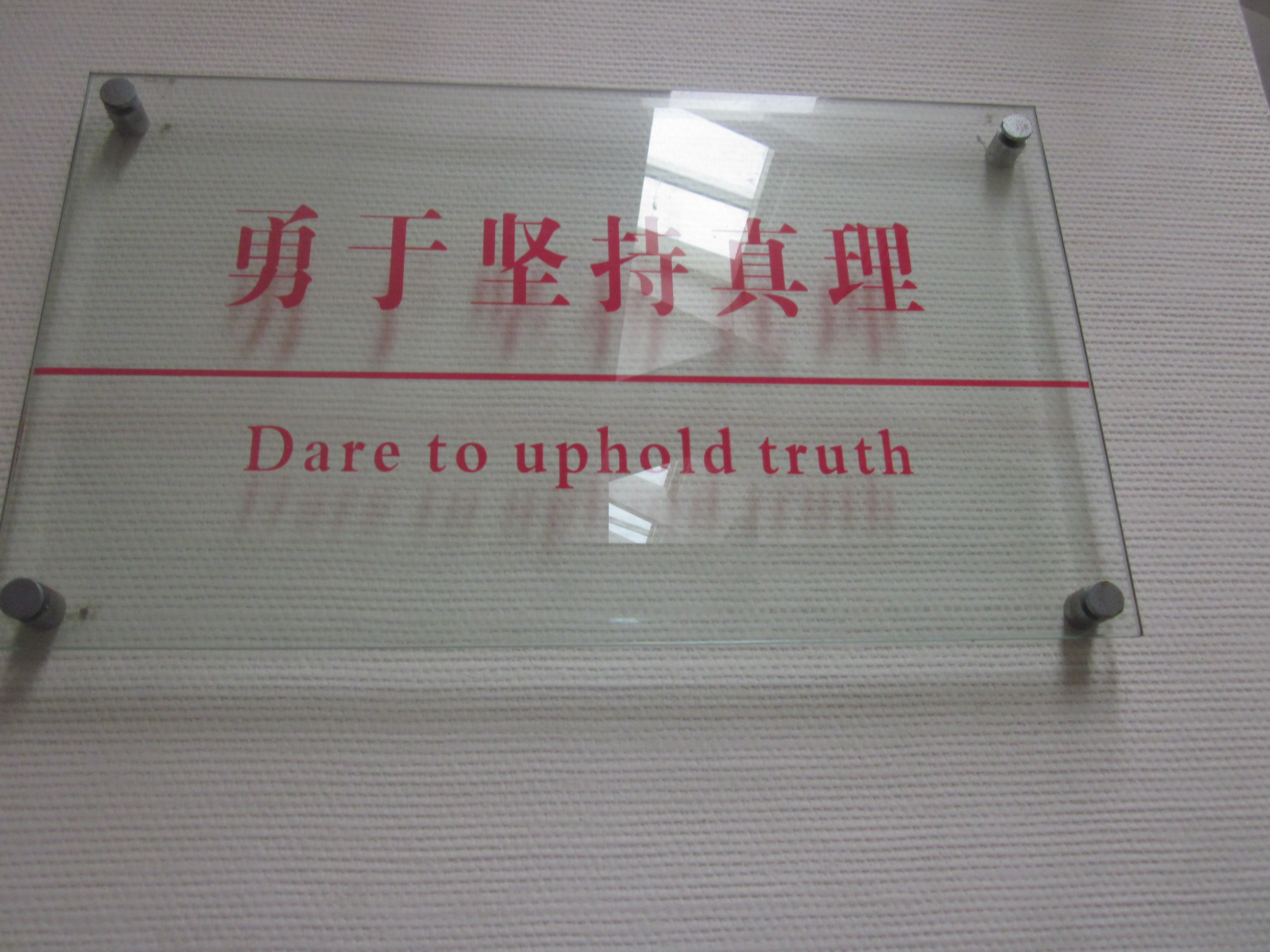
A slogan in the former residence of Hu Yaobang, who was the General Secretary of the Chinese Communist Party from 1982 to early 1987.

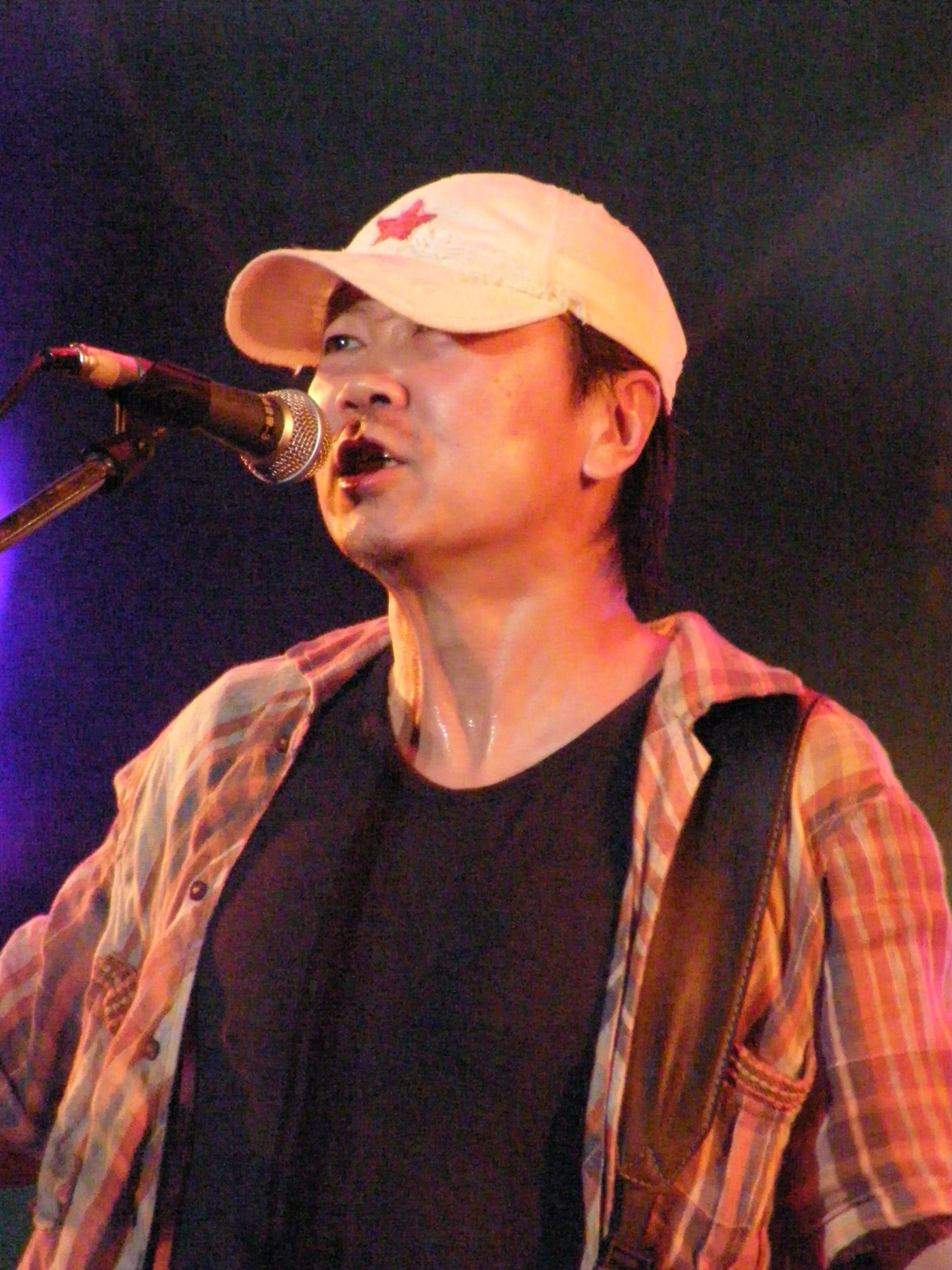
Nothing to My Name (1986) by Cui Jian, the "Father of Chinese rock", was regarded as the beginning of Chinese rock music. The song became a symbol of the 1980s of China, and rock music was viewed as one of the most direct forms of enlightenment in China.

New Enlightenment (simplified Chinese: 新启蒙; traditional Chinese: 新啟蒙), or the New Enlightenment movement (simplified Chinese: 新启蒙运动; traditional Chinese: 新啟蒙運動), was a massive social and cultural movement in mainland China that originated in the late 1970s and lasted for over a decade. Growing out of the 1978 Truth Criterion Discussion during the Boluan Fanzheng period, the New Enlightenment is widely regarded as a new wave of enlightenment within Chinese society since the May Fourth Movement in 1919. The decade of the 1980s has thus been called the Age of New Enlightenment in China.

The theme of the New Enlightenment movement included promoting democracy and science, embracing humanism and universal values such as freedom, human rights and rule of law, while opposing the ideology of Cultural Revolution and feudalism. The movement gave rise to a number of new literature genres such as the scar literature and the misty poetry, meanwhile aesthetics also became a popular topic in society. In addition, the growth of the publication industry, the birth of new music genres such as Chinese rock, and the rise of the Chinese film industry all contributed significantly to the New Enlightenment. Notable leading figures of the movement included Fang Lizhi, Li Zehou, and Wang Yuanhua.

The New Enlightenment movement ended due to the Tiananmen Square massacre in June 1989. After Deng Xiaoping's southern tour in early 1992, however, the academic and intellectual circle in mainland China thrived again but became divided, forming two major schools of thought: the Liberals and the New Left. On the other hand, as the capital market and market economy expanded in China, traditional intellectuals quickly lost their leadership role in social development which they enjoyed during the New Enlightenment in the 1980s, meanwhile entrepreneurs and business elites became increasingly influential.

== Origin ==
After the Chinese Cultural Revolution ended in 1976, Deng Xiaoping and his allies launched the Boluan Fanzheng program in 1977 to correct the mistakes of Cultural Revolution and, by the end of 1978, Deng replaced Hua Guofeng as the paramount leader of China. During the power struggle with Hua, Deng and his allies started the Truth Criterion Discussion in May 1978, which not only helped Deng win the power struggle over Hua, but also became the origin of the New Enlightenment movement in mainland China.

== History ==
=== Publication ===
Wang Yuanhua, a notable scholar who was often credited for coining the term "New Enlightenment" in the 1980s, founded the journal New Enlightenment in Shanghai in 1988. Wang himself participated in a short-lived Enlightenment movement initiated by the Chinese Communist Party (CCP) in the 1930s, and in the 1980s he called on renewal of the enlightenment philosophy from the May Fourth Movement in 1919, which included promoting democracy and science. Li Rui, Wang Ruoshui, Liu Xiaobo, Gu Zhun and a number of other CCP officials and notable scholars published articles in the New Enlightenment journal. However, the journal soon ceased its operation in 1989 due to the Tiananmen Square protests and massacre.

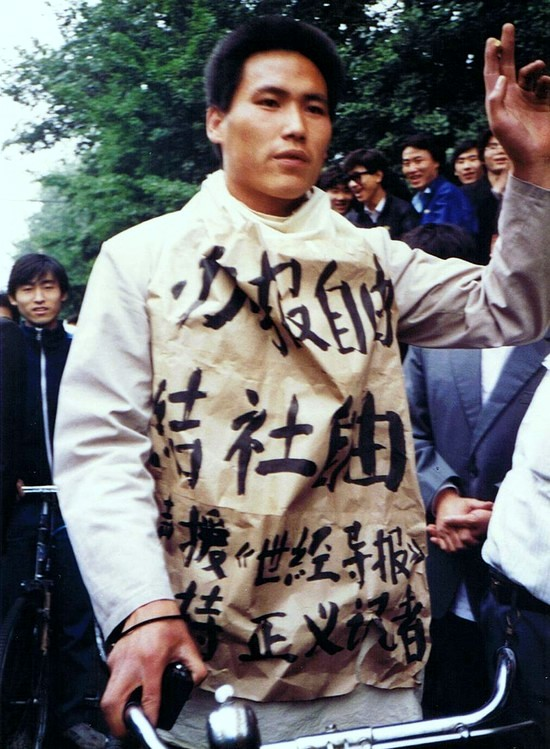
Pu Zhiqiang publicly defended the World Economic Herald, which was forcibly shut down by Jiang Zemin in Shanghai before the Tiananmen Square massacre in 1989.

In fact, the publication industry in mainland China already began to thrive during the early phase of the Boluan Fanzheng period. As early as in March 1979, Li Honglin, known as the "flag bearer for New Enlightenment", published an article titled "No Forbidden Areas for Reading Books" in the founding issue of Dushu magazine, calling for elimination of all restrictions on reading books. In 1980, Qin Benli founded the World Economic Herald, which later became the forefront for promoting and defending freedom of the press as well as freedom of speech in mainland China, earning its reputation as China's most liberal and forthright newspaper. In 1984, Jin Guantao and others began to publish the Toward the Future Book Series, which played a major role in introducing "universal values" and a variety of other modern concepts to the Chinese public. Even though both the Herald and the Book Series were banned due to the Tiananmen Square massacre in 1989, the ban of the latter was lifted after Deng Xiaoping's southern tour in 1992. Other important newspapers, journals and book series included Economics Weekly (经济学周报), Dushu magazine (读书), Culture: China and the World (文化: 中国与世界) edited by Gan Yang, and so on.

=== Social activities ===
A spectrum of activists and social groups with different thoughts became active in the 1980s, from further developing traditional Chinese culture by learning from the western civilization, to embracing Total Westernization. For example, Liu Xiaobo, who later won the Nobel Peace Prize in 2010, once said in an interview in 1988, that "it had taken 100 years of [British] colonialism to bring Hong Kong up to what it is, and given the size of China, it would certainly need 300 years of colonization for it to become like what Hong Kong is today. I even doubt whether 300 years would be enough." The TV documentary River Elegy in 1988 was another well-known example of making self-criticism over traditional Chinese culture. On the other hand, a number of leading Chinese philosophers including Liang Shuming, Feng Youlan, Ji Xianlin, Zhang Dainian (张岱年), and Tang Yijie founded the Academy of Chinese Culture (中国文化书院) in Beijing in 1984, which organized numerous seminars and classes studying and comparing Chinese and western cultures, in the hope of further developing traditional Chinese culture.

Meanwhile, Fang Lizhi, then vice president of the University of Science and Technology of China, was an influential figure in promoting democracy and universal human rights. In his famous speeches in 1986, Fang noted that "Democracy is not a favor bestowed from above; it should be won through people's own efforts." Fang said publicly, that "We should not place our hope on grants from the top leadership. Democracy granted from above is not democracy in a real sense. It is relaxation of control". In January 1989, in memory of the 200th anniversary of the French Revolution as well as the 70th anniversary of the May Fourth Movement, Fang wrote an open letter to Deng Xiaoping, then paramount leader of China, calling for amnesty and release of Wei Jingsheng and other similar political prisoners. The letter inspired other intellectuals and scientists to follow suit with open letters in support.

=== Literature and films ===
After the Cultural Revolution ended in 1976, a number of new literature genres emerged in the late 1970s in mainland China, including the scar literature and the misty poetry. The former reflected on the Cultural Revolution and the disasters that it brought to the Chinese society, while the latter expressed the true emotions of individuals through its unique style and has been described as a continuation of the enlightenment tradition of the May Fourth Movement. Moreover, Ba Jin, a notable Chinese writer, called on the Chinese society to establish Cultural Revolution museums in order to prevent a second calamity of this scale:

"Let history not be repeated" must not be an empty phrase. In order that everyone sees clearly and remembers clearly, it is necessary to build a museum of the "Cultural Revolution," exhibiting concrete and real objects, and reconstructing striking scenes which will testify to what took place on this Chinese soil twenty years ago! Everyone will recall the march of events there, and each will recall his or her behavior during that decade.

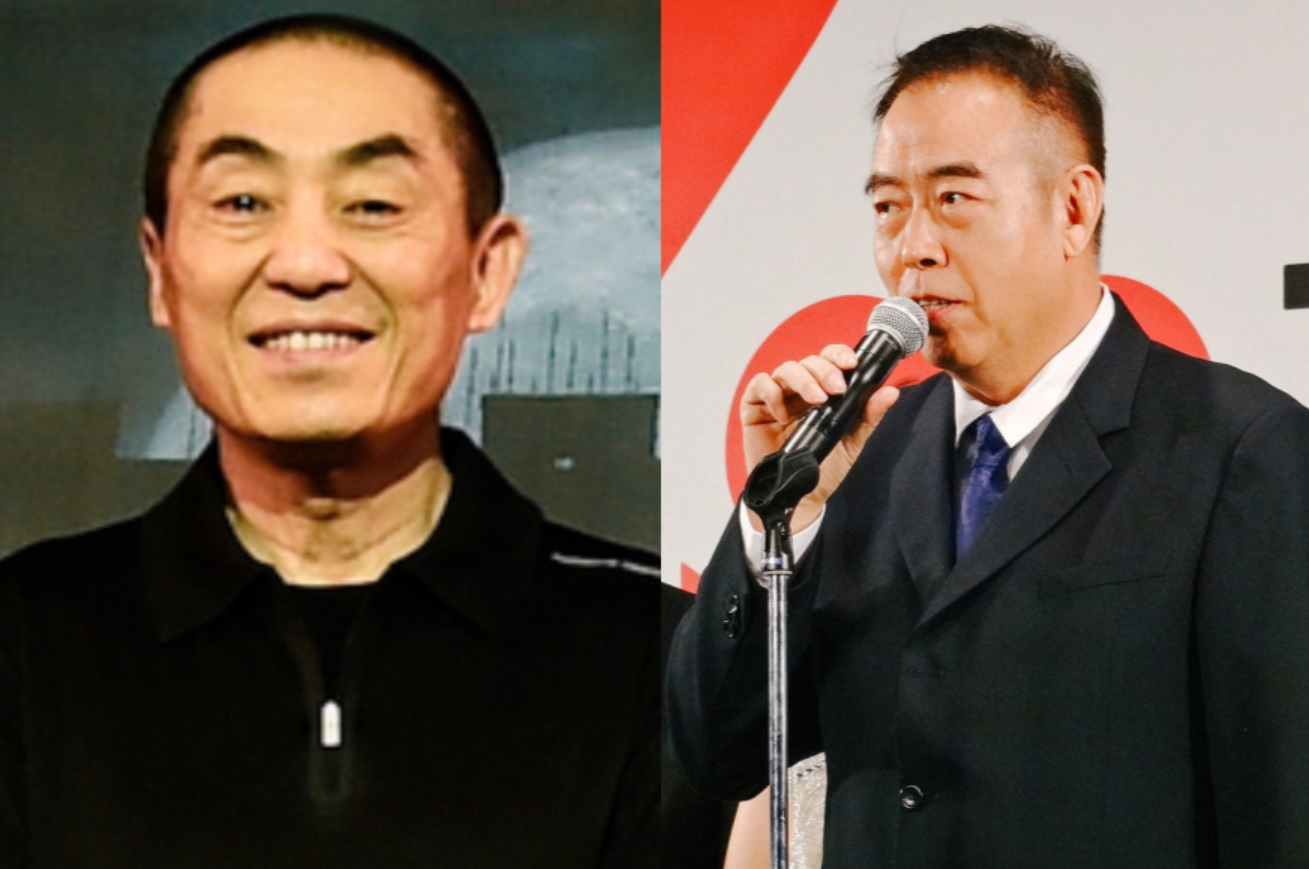
Leaders of the fifth generation of Chinese filmmakers: Zhang Yimou (left) and Chen Kaige (right)

Meanwhile, the 1980s saw the rise of the fifth generation of Chinese filmmakers, notably Chen Kaige and Zhang Yimou, who directed a number of "enlightening" films such as the Yellow Earth (1984), King of the Children (1987) and Red Sorghum (1988). It has been argued that the fifth generation of film was continuation of the Enlightenment since the May Fourth Movement, in which the Enlightenment was embedded in national salvation and the motivation of Enlightenment was national salvation. In fact, as early as 1978, foreign films began to enter Chinese market as China's rolled out its reform and opening up policies, with Japanese film Manhunt (1976) being the first foreign film introduced to the Chinese audience after the Cultural Revolution, becoming an instant blockbuster and a "cultural enlightenment". Subsequently, in 1980, China's first home-made film that contains a kissing scene, Romance on Lushan Mountain, inspired and enlightened a generation of young people's view on fashion and love, ushering a new era for China's domestic film industry.

=== Aesthetics and arts ===
In the 1980s, Chinese society experienced an "Aesthetics Fever" (美学热), which was an integral part of the "Cultural Fever" or "Culture Craze" (文化热) and the New Enlightenment movement. Being one of the top aestheticians in China in the 1980s, Li Zehou was responsible for starting and leading the "Aesthetics Fever"; his celebrated work The Path of Beauty: A Study of Chinese Aesthetics was widely read and has been translated into several languages. Li was also one of the first intellectuals to publicly endorse the Stars Art Group as well as the Misty Poets. The "Aesthetics Fever" was believed to have inspired people to reflect on and discuss their revolutionary ideology and their way of living, and Li's books on aesthetics were widely read among Chinese university students eager for something other than political slogans.

The '85 New Wave is regarded as the birth of Chinese Contemporary Art, when a group of young artists drastically changed the landscape of China's fine art by introducing Western elements in their works starting from 1985. The '85 New Wave, also known as the '85 Art Movement, was the first nationwide avant-garde art movement in Chinese modern art history. The artistic practices in the '85 New Wave are regarded to be culturally enlightening and thought-liberating, and is considered a cultural practice of the New Enlightenment.

=== Popular and rock music ===
Since the opening of China in the late 1970s, Mandarin popular music or Mandopop from Taiwan and Hong Kong had made a widespread and long-lasting impact on the Chinese public. Most notably, the pop songs by Deng Lijun, known as the "Eternal Queen of Asian Pop", are believed to have an "enlightening" power that awakes humanistic nature. At the same time, Homeland Love (乡恋) by Li Guyi in 1980 is considered to be the first pop song made within mainland China, which exhibits truthful elements of humanity and echoes humanism.

In 1986, Cui Jian debuted his rock song Nothing to My Name which became the starting point of Chinese rock music. According to aesthetician Gao Ertai, Cui Jian and rock music may be the only form of art that could have an "enlightening" effect at the time, and China needed Enlightenment. The song later became an unofficial anthem for Chinese youth and activists during the 1989 Tiananmen Square protests and massacre.

== Resistance and repression ==
The development of the New Enlightenment movement encountered a variety of resistance from within the Chinese Communist Party (CCP) since the beginning. At the CCP Theory Conference in early 1979, Deng Xiaoping, then paramount leader of China, proposed the Four Cardinal Principles which soon became the official boundary of political liberalization in mainland China and was incorporated in the China's Constitution in 1982. The principles forbid any challenges to Mao Zedong Thought and Marxism–Leninism, as well as to the leadership of CCP. In the mid-1980s, neoauthoritarianism, which emphasized political stability, gradualism, stability, order, and gradual modernization, emerged in the intellectual community as a counter-movement to the radicalizing trend of liberalism. The emergence of this ideology was immediately met with a strong backlash from liberal intellectuals.

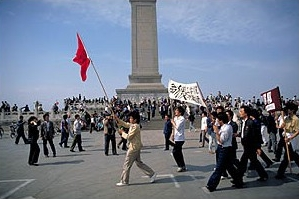
The democracy movement of China led by students in 1989, before the Tiananmen Square Massacre.

In 1983, left-wing conservative power within the CCP launched the "Campaign against spiritual pollution", opposing Western-inspired liberal ideas. The short-lived campaign hit the burgeoning industry of science fiction significantly in mainland China. Subsequently, in 1986–87, the left-wing conservative power continued to launched the campaign of "anti-Bourgeois liberalization", as a response to the 1986 Chinese student demonstrations. Hu Yaobang, then General Secretary of the Chinese Communist Party, was forced to resign due to his sympathetic stance on the student movements. Fang Lizhi, Wang Ruowang and Liu Binyan who played important roles in the New Enlightenment movement were all expelled from the CCP by direct order from Deng Xiaoping.

Eventually, in June 1989, the New Enlightenment movement ended due to the Tiananmen Square massacre, which also effectively ended China's political reforms in the 1980s. Zhao Ziyang, then General Secretary of the CCP, was purged from the central leadership due to his sympathetic stance on the student movements. In an official government report, Chen Xitong, then mayor of Beijing, labelled certain activities of the New Enlightenment as "some political gatherings with very wrong or even reactionary views". Another CCP official was quoted to have claimed that "while the May Fourth Movement created the CCP, the New Enlightenment movement intends to create an opposition party." On the other hand, Wang Dan, one of the student leaders of the Tiananmen Square protests, argued that "the 1989 democracy movement was an enlightenment movement"; he noted that for most of the decade of the 1980s, the enlightenment work was limited to paper, which took the form of essays, lectures, interviews, and the translation of foreign works on the social sciences, and the New Enlightenment movement reached its climax at the 1989 democracy movement.

== Aftermath and later development ==
The Tiananmen Square massacre in 1989 sent China's reform and opening program into stagnation, while academia and intellectual circle in mainland China entered a phase of hibernation and deep reflection. After Deng Xiaoping's southern tour in early 1992, however, China finally resumed its economic reforms and opening, and Deng's pragmatic and influential remarks during the southern tour became widely popular, such as the cat theory ("I don't care if the cat is black or white, so long as it catches mice)".

However, the New Enlightenment movement did not proceed as in the 1980s; instead, two major schools of thought emerged in the 1990s: the Liberalism and the New Left. After Wang Hui published his article "Contemporary Chinese Thought and the Question of Modernity" in the mid-1990s, the two schools went into heated debate regarding the future of China. The Liberalism school argued that China should continue its reform and opening, further developing market economy while pushing forward political reforms for human rights, freedom, democracy, rule of law and constitutionalism; high-ranking Chinese officials including Chinese Premier Zhu Rongji and Premier Wen Jiabao have expressed various degree of support over this view. On the other hand, the New Left argued that capitalism had become prevalent in mainland China with worsening corruption and widening economic inequality, which were common issues in the development of western capitalism, and therefore the New Left criticizes market mechanism and calls for social justice as well as equality, defending some of Mao Zedong's policies during the Cultural Revolution.

New Enlightenment figures Li Zehou and Liu Zaifu wrote A Farewell to Revolution in 1995. The book, which criticised Mao-era radicalism and mass uprising as violent and called to "bid farewell to revolution" in favor of incremental reform and the development of democratic temperament, became a major text for those who continued to advocate the New Enlightenment ideals. The book also led to the increasing divergence of perspective between liberal intellectuals and New Left intellectuals over the New Enlightenment legacy, as New Left intellectuals viewed the book as a veiled neoliberal effort to depoliticise radical thinking and legitimate end-of-history liberal triumphalism.

== Notable figures ==
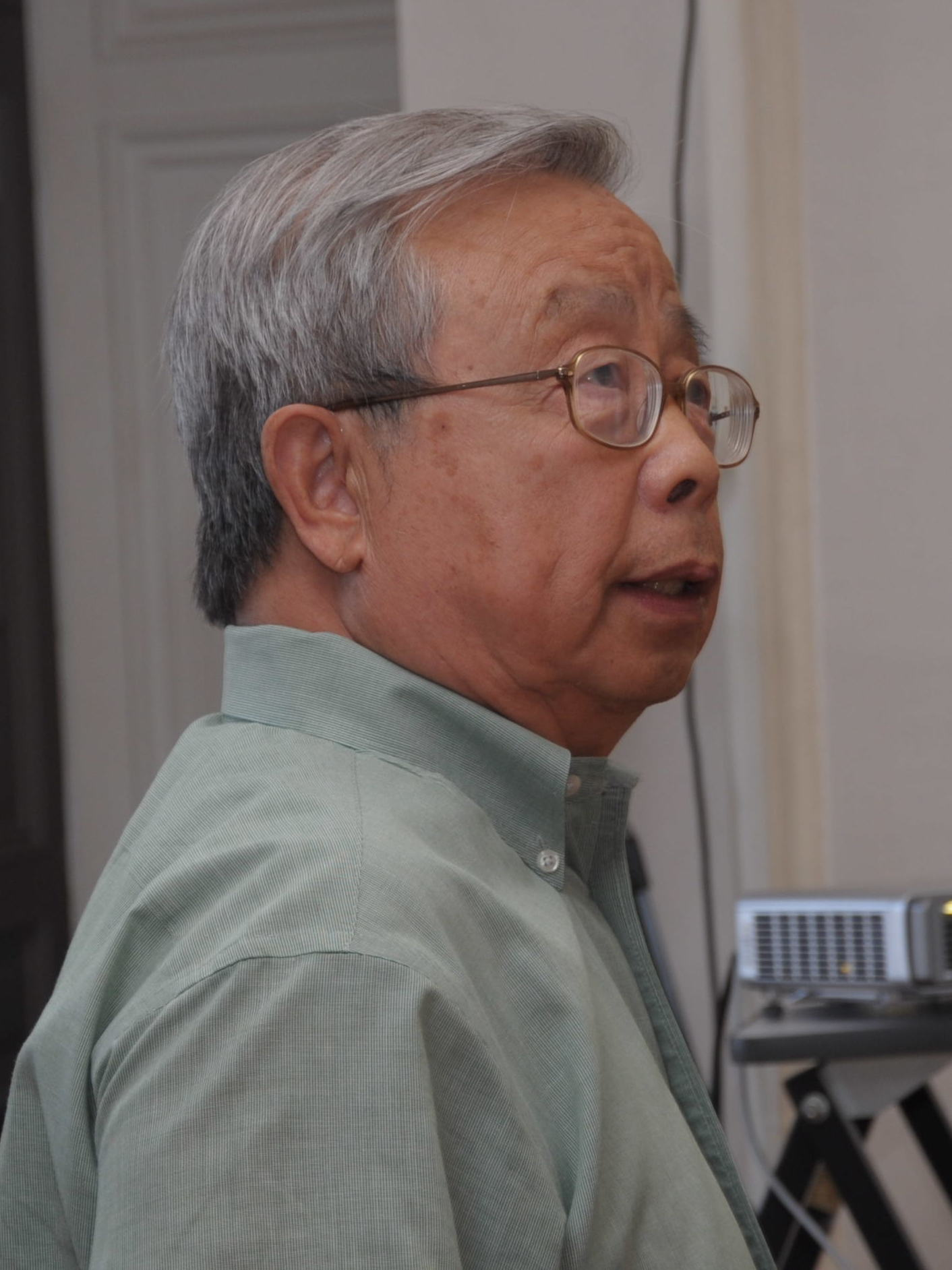
Fang Lizhi

Intellectual leaders of the New Enlightenment movement include:

- Wang Yuanhua
- Fang Lizhi
- Li Zehou
- Jin Guantao
- Wen Yuankai

Other important intellectuals include Yan Jiaqi, Bao Zunxin, Liu Binyan, Wang Ruowang, Pang Pu (庞朴), Ba Jin, Jiang Ping, Liu Xiaobo and so on.

On the other hand, as General Secretary of the Chinese Communist Party (CCP), Hu Yaobang and his successor Zhao Ziyang were both staunch supporters of thought liberation and were sympathetic over the student movements in the 1980s. Hu was forced to resign in early 1987 due to the 1986 Chinese student demonstrations, while Zhao was ousted in June 1989 right after the Tiananmen Square protests and massacre. Other high-ranking CCP officials who contributed to the New Enlightenment movement included Zhou Yang, Li Shenzhi, Hu Jiwei, Wang Ruoshui, Li Honglin, Yuan Geng, and so on.

== See also ==
- Salvation overwhelmed enlightenment
- May Fourth Movement and New Culture Movement
- Hundred Flowers Campaign
- Marxist humanism
- Khrushchev Thaw
- Glasnost and New political thinking
- Eastward spread of Western learning
