= Wang Hui (intellectual) =

Chinese professor of Language and Literature (born 1959)

- 汪晖
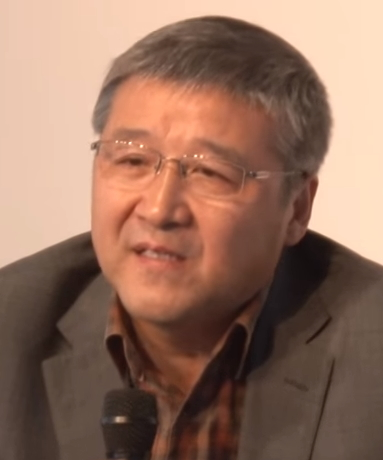
- Wang Hui at the Rosa Luxemburg Foundation in 2016
- Born: 10 October 1959 (age 67); Yangzhou, Jiangsu, China

Education
- Education: Yangzhou Normal University (BA); Nanjing University (MA); Chinese Academy of Social Sciences (PhD)

Philosophical work
- Era: 20th-/21st-century philosophy

Wang Hui (Chinese: 汪晖; pinyin: Wāng Huī; Yangzhou, 10 October 1959) is a professor in the Department of Chinese Language and Literature, Tsinghua University, Beijing. Wang is sometimes described as part of the Chinese New Left, although he does not describe himself as such.

== Biography ==
Wang Hui was born in Yangzhou, Jiangsu, in 10 October 1959. After finishing high school in Yangzhou, Wang Hui worked for two years as a factory worker before entering college. He completed his undergraduate studies at Yangzhou University (then Yangzhou Normal College), and then graduate studies at Nanjing University and the Chinese Academy of Social Sciences, where he received his Ph.D. in 1988.

Wang Hui was a participant in the 1989 Tiananmen Square protests. He was investigated about his involvement, but nothing significant or serious was found. He was later sent to accumulate experience in Shangluo, Shaanxi, for one year.

== Work ==
In 1997, Wang published a series of essays describing the emancipatory potential of Mao-era mass politics. These essays resulted in significant debate between China's liberal intellectuals and left intellectuals.

Wang contends that the experience of World War I shaped Chinese thinking about China's collective future, its national identity, and its civilization.

His researches focus on contemporary Chinese literature and intellectual history. He was the executive editor (with Huang Ping) of the influential magazine Dushu (读书, Reading) from May 1996 to July 2007. The US magazine Foreign Policy named him as one of the top 100 public intellectuals in the world in May 2008.

Wang Hui has been Visiting Professor at Harvard, Edinburgh, Bologna, Stanford, UCLA, Berkeley, and the University of Washington, among others. In March 2010, he appeared as the keynote speaker at the annual meeting for the Association for Asian Studies. Wang Hui has held multiple short-term fellowships at the Swedish Collegium for Advanced Study in Uppsala, Sweden.

== Political stance ==
Wang is generally viewed as a member of the Chinese New Left. Wang has been called the leader of the Chinese New Left, but he has refused this label:

Actually, people like myself have always been reluctant to accept this label, pinned on us by our adversaries. Partly, this is because we have no wish to be associated with the Cultural Revolution or, for that matter, with what might be called the 'Old Left' of the reform-era CCP. But it is also because the term New Left is a Western one, with a very distinct set of connotations – generational and political – in Europe and America. Our historical context is Chinese, not Western, and it is doubtful whether a category imported so explicitly from the West could be helpful in today's China.

Chinese intellectuals such as Xu Jilin and Chen Ziming point out the affinity between Wang Hui and Chinese neoconservatism in defense of party-state dictatorship. Scholar Chen Chun wrote in 2022 that Wang Hui has been generally compared with nationalists in Chinese academic circles, especially after 2010, most of Wang Hui's statements could be used to defend the leadership of the Chinese Communist Party.

Wang contends that the Cultural Revolution should not be unconditionally condemned.

In his essay China's Rise: Experiences and Challenges, Wang writes that while many consider China undemocratic, "during the 1950s, 1960s, and 1970s, there existed within the party a self-correction mechanism. Theoretical debate, particularly open theoretical debate, played an important role in the course of the party's and the state's self-adjustment and self-reform."

== Incidents ==
=== Cheung Kong Dushu Prize ===
Wang Hui was involved in the controversy following the results of the Cheung Kong Dushu Prize (长江读书奖) in 2000. The prize was set up by Sir Ka-shing Li, which awards one million RMB in total to be shared by the winners. The 3 recipients of the prize in 2000 were Wang Hui, who served as the coordinator of the academic selection committee of the prize, Fei Xiaotong, the Honorary Chairman of the committee, and Qian Liqun, another committee member. Wang Hui was then the editor-in-chief of Dushu magazine, which was the administrative body of the prize.

The Cheung Kong Dushu (Reading) prize "controversy" was used as a case study in Barme and Davies's and demonstrated the bitterness and hostility of two factional camps of Chinese intellectuals based in Beijing and Shanghai and who labelled each other as "Neoliberal' and "New Leftist." (p87) Under the bickering attack of "unethical wrongdoings, nepotism and intellectual thuggery" and "equity in the complex workings of global capital condemnation what was perceived to be unethical", (p87) Wang Hui was accused of awarding to himself a prestigious "humanistic" (p94) and seemingly a relatively high monetary value from the "New Left-dominant selection committee" in which Wang Hui was a member. This triggered a heated brawl over the internet circle between the two camps with the defense accusing the other on the "jealousy" over Wang's relative meteoritic rise to international fame. The award of the prize nonetheless generated diverse range of discussion modes in the then contemporary "still nascent Chinese cyber public space". (p99) The accusation of collective resentment and betrayal, catering to left leaning Anglophone scholars with their Euro-American cultural thought, (p88), assumption of political-moral authority and thereby Chinese cultural legitimacy as "rightful" inheritance of Chinese cultural capital (p97) were all used as weapons of attack that include such mention as "moral high ground" (p89), "financial conflict" (p93), "intellectual autonomy" (p88), decay of intellectual friendship (p95), and even historical precedent of intellectual debate in early Northern Song and late Ming (p95) as weapons of assault. The "neo-liberalist" group composed of intellect such as Dai Qing (p85), Liu Junning, (p90) Xu Youyu (p90), Wu Jiaxing (p91) and Zhao Chunming (p92, 93) and the rival "New Leftist" lead by Wang Hui himself and Yan Gan (p92), Fan Yong (founder and publisher of the Reading) (p88), and Cui Zhiyuan (p92) came to their defense of the other in their "malicious assault, groundless attacks and the exploitation of intellectual sphere. " (p98) They declined "New leftist" such label as they are seen as a "western interpretation" and the historical incorrect connotation of "failed left of the Cultural Revolution and the Maoist past within mainland Chinese discourse." (p90)

=== Allegations of plagiarism ===
Wang Binbin, a professor of literature from Nanjing University, accused Wang Hui of plagiarism, citing what he deemed to be improper use of footnote protocols and incorrectly cited passages in Wang's doctoral dissertation on Lu Xun 《反抗绝望》 (Against Despair). Wang Binbin's accusation was first published on an academic journal, and reappeared on Southern Weekly on March 25, 2010. Wang Binbin further suggested that Wang Hui, in his The Rise of Modern Chinese Thought, may have used R. G. Collingwood's canonical book, The Idea of History, with or without proper citations.

Apart from Wang Binbin's findings, an analysis of Wang Hui's weak use of footnotes by Xiang Yihua, a researcher with the Zhejiang Academy of Social Sciences, revealed other sections incorporating sources without citation. He also published a review of Wang Hui's essay 《"赛先生"在中国的命运》 (English translation: "The Fate of 'Mr. Science' in China"), questioning the originality of his research.

Online commentators found some paragraphs in Against Despair to be copied verbatim from other sources. Authors such as M. B. Khrapchenko and F. C. Copleston were used without acknowledgment to either the original works or their translations.

Some scholars are concerned over the plagiarism accusations. Lin Yu-sheng says that some of the plagiarism charges are sustained, which is concurred by Yu Ying-shih. An open letter signed by more than 60 scholars called for the Chinese Academy of Social Sciences and Tsinghua University to investigate the plagiarism case.

Some international scholars and weblog authors have come to Wang's defense, noting that this is mostly a case of sloppy citation practice, not actual plagiarism. A letter signed by 96 scholars, addressed to the authority of Tsinghua University, endorsing Wang Hui's scholarly integrity was made public on 9 July. Most of the passages highlighted by Wang Binbin did actually have citations to the original works, asking readers to "consult" those works. It is argued that there is no attempt by Wang Hui to hide the sources of the sections in question, even if the citations were, at times, nonstandard.

=== Unauthorized republication and censorship of CAS articles ===
On October 25, 2017, the director and the editors of the journal Critical Asian Studies issued a statement in regard to the republication and censorship of two articles from the journal without either the authors' or the publisher's permission. The two articles are Claudia Pozzana and Alessandro Russo's "China's New Order and Past Disorders: A Dialogue Starting from Wang Hui's Analysis" (2006), and their "Continuity/Discontinuity: China's Place in the Contemporary World" (2011). According to the statement, the 2006 article was censored and republished in a Chinese journal edited by Wang Hui himself in 2015, and the 2011 article was republished in 2014, unauthorized. In the censored republications, passages concerning Tiananmen Square protests of 1989 were deleted.

== Works ==
Wang has authored dozens of books, articles, and public statements on the scholarly and socio-political issues of the day. Some of his work has been translated into English and other languages.

Wang Hui's monographs include, in Chinese:

- From An Asian Perspective: The Narrations of Chinese History (亞洲視野：中國歷史的敘述), 2010;
- For Alternative Voices (別求新聲), 2009;
- Depoliticized Politics (去政治化的政治), 2008;
- The Rise of Modern Chinese Thought (four volumes,《現代中國思想的興起), 2004–2009); and
- Rekindling Frozen Fire: The Paradox of Modernity (死火重溫), 2000.

His books, translated into English, include:

- The Rise of Modern Chinese Thought (four volumes), in press;
- The End of Revolution: China and the Limits of Modernity (Verso, 2010);
- China's New Order: Society, Politics, and Economy in Transition, translated by Ted Huters and Rebecca Karl (Harvard University Press, 2003);
- Shisō kūkan toshite no gendai chūgoku (Modern China as a Space for Thinking), translated by Murata Yujiro, Sunayama Yukio, and Onodera Shiro (Tokyo: Iwanami Shoten, 2006);
- A New Asian Imagination (in Korean; Seoul: Creation and Criticism Press, 2003); and
- The Politics of Imagining Asia, translated by Theodore Huters, (Harvard University Press, 2011);
- China from Empire to Nation-State (2014);
- China's Twentieth Century: Revolution, Retreat and the Road to Equality, edited by Saul Thomas, numerous translators, (First published by Verso, 2016).
- The Rise of Modern Chinese Thought. Harvard University Press. 18 July 2023. ISBN 978-0-674-04676-4.

== See also ==
- New Left in China
- "Contemporary Chinese Thought and the Question of Modernity", a major 1997 article by Wang
