= Wang Hui's plagiarism incident =

Academic plagiarism incident in China

The Wang Hui plagiarism incident refers to a series of academic integrity allegations raised in 2010 against Wang Hui (汪晖), a prominent professor at Tsinghua University. The dispute centered on claims that portions of Wang's 1988 doctoral dissertation, later published as the book Resisting Despair: Lu Xun and His Literary World (《反抗绝望：鲁迅及其文学世界》), contained unattributed textual borrowings from multiple sources. The case sparked intense debate about academic ethics in China and the standards of scholarly attribution.

== Evolution ==
=== Initial allegations ===
On March 10, 2010, Wang Binbin (王彬彬), professor at Nanjing University, published a 12,000-word exposé titled "The Question of Academic Ethics in Wang Hui's Scholarship" in the journal Southern Metropolis Cultural Review (《南方都市报》). The article alleged that Wang Hui's dissertation contained over 30 instances of "inappropriate citation," including:

- Verbatim copying of passages from scholars like Li Zehou and American historian Lin Yusheng without quotation marks or footnotes.
- Paraphrased arguments from Japanese scholar Maruyama Noboru's 1965 Lu Xun study without proper attribution.
- Structural similarities to earlier Chinese scholarship on Lu Xun's intellectual development timeline.

Wang Binbin argued these constituted "serious violations of academic norms" rather than accidental oversights, noting that the 2004 revised edition retained most disputed passages.

=== Responses ===
In a March 25, 2010 statement, Wang Hui acknowledged "citation irregularities" but denied intentional plagiarism, attributing issues to "formatting inconsistencies" from merging dissertation footnotes into book form, "technical errors" in 1980s Chinese academia's nascent citation standards, and "political motivations behind the timing of allegations".

Over 80 scholars signed an open letter arguing that allegations ignored "historical context" of 1980s Chinese academic practices, that critics conflated "citation flaws" with deliberate plagiarism, and that the attack reflected ideological opposition to Wang.

=== Critics' counterarguments ===
A group of 91 international scholars, including Perry Link and Andrew Nathan, countered "basic scholarly ethics are timeless," rejecting the "different era" justification. They also noted similar passages remained in post-2000 reprints without correction. They called for Tsinghua University to conduct a formal investigation.

On August 3, Huang Yingquan, a professor at the School of Literature at Capital Normal University, analyzed why Wang Hui’s doctoral thesis advisor Tang Tao and others were deceived by Wang Hui:

Wang Hui deceived the modern literary research community by peddling material that his mentors and colleagues barely understood... Perhaps due to his age and lack of familiarity with new works and translations, and his excessive trust in Wang Hui's character, Tang Tao failed to spot the flaws. Other colleagues, such as Qian Liqun, may be similarly affected. I believe Wang Hui's hallmark is his tendency to compress everything he has read into his "works." This approach can easily mislead those confined to a specific field, leading them to believe the author is far more knowledgeable than they are, and thus to hesitate to judge. Consequently, Wang Hui's "hodgepodge" of works is misinterpreted as masterpieces, and an academic fraud is portrayed as an academic genius.

On August 5, Wang Hui commissioned a law firm to send a lawyer’s letter to Wang Binbin, stating that “the accusations in your series of articles that Professor Wang has plagiarized and plagiarized are false and may constitute defamation of Professor Wang’s reputation.” After receiving the lawyer’s letter, Wang immediately began writing “Revisiting the Plagiarism Issue of Wang Hui’s “The Rise of Modern Chinese Thought,” stating that if “Resisting Despair” contained some original content, then “The Rise of Modern Thought,” “to paraphrase Eileen Chang, can be said to be crawling with lice under its gorgeous coat.”

=== Institutional reactions ===
Despite petitions, Tsinghua's and CASS' administration declined to reopen Wang's 22-year-old dissertation case, stating that no current university regulations mandated retroactive plagiarism reviews.
