= 2022 in Taiwan =

- Decades: 2000s; 2010s; 2020s
- See also: Other events of 2022; History of Taiwan • Timeline • Years

Events from the year 2022 in Taiwan, Republic of China. This year is numbered Minguo 111 according to the official Republic of China calendar.

== Incumbents ==
- President: Tsai Ing-wen
- Vice President: Lai Ching-te
- Premier:
  - Su Tseng-chang
- Vice Premier:
  - Shen Jong-chin

== Events ==
=== Dates TBD ===
- 2022 U-23 Baseball World Cup

=== January–March ===
- 9 January
  - Recall election for Taipei City Constituency V, represented in the Legislative Yuan by Freddy Lim.
  - 2022 Taiwanese legislative by-election held in Taichung City Constituency II, a vacant Legislative Yuan seat following the October 2021 recall election against legislator Chen Po-wei.
- 4–20 February Chinese Taipei at the 2022 Winter Olympics.

=== April–June ===
- 2 April – 2022 Chinese Professional Baseball League season begins.
- 24 June – Index case of the 2022 monkeypox outbreak in Taiwan reported.

=== July–September ===
- 2–3 August – 2022 visit by Nancy Pelosi to Taiwan
- 2 August – 2022 Chinese military exercises around Taiwan
- 17–18 September – 2022 Taitung earthquakes

=== October–December ===
- 26 November
  - 2022 Taiwanese local elections
  - 2022 Taiwanese constitutional referendum

== Deaths ==
- 11 January – Pang Chien-kuo, 68, politician, MLY (2002–2005), fall.
- 31 January – Liao Cheng-hao, 75, politician, Minister of Justice (1996–1998).
- 6 February – Huang Wen-yao, 65, puppeteer (Pili).
- 7 February – Chen Shih-yung, 73, politician, Chiayi County magistrate (1989–1993).
- 8 February – Ming Chin-cheng, 51, television director (The Teen Age, Monga Yao Hui, Say I Love You) and actor.
- 11 February – Chen Wen-min, 102, filmmaker.
- 13 February – Gottfried Vonwyl, 90, Swiss-Taiwanese priest.
- 14 February – Lin Kun-hai, 68, media executive (Sanlih E-Television), oral cancer.
- 16 February
  - Lien Jih-ching, 94, entomologist.
  - Ba Ge, 67, actor, pancreatic cancer.
- 13 March – Tang Chuan, 69, actor (All in 700, Let's Go Crazy on LIVE!, Gold Leaf).
- 15 March – Lu Liang-Huan, 85, golfer.
- 19 March – Ku Pao-ming, 71, actor.
- 24 March – Chiu Chen, 72, musician.
- 2 April – Liao Hsiang-hsiung, 89, film director and regulator.
- 5 April – Jimmy Wang Yu, 79, actor and film director.
- 6 April – Wen Hsia, 93, singer and actor.
- 8 April – Peng Ming-min, 98, democracy activist.
- 6 May – George Huang, 88, politician, Changhua County magistrate (1981–1989), Chairman of the Central Election Commission (1994–1995, 1999–2004).
- 7 May – Hu Tai-li, 72, ethnologist and filmmaker.
- 9 May – Chen Bing-nan, 88, actor and comedian.
- 12 June – Huang Wen-je, 65, puppeteer (Pili).
- 15 June – Chang Wen-i, 73, politician, MLY (1993–2002).
- 27 June – Wu Jin-yun, 84, Olympic athlete (1960).
- 3 July – Miu Chu, 40, singer, breast cancer.
- 6 August – Ouyang Li-hsing, 57, military researcher (National Chung-Shan Institute of Science and Technology), heart attack.
- 25 October – Chen Tzu-fu, 96, film poster artist
- 22 November – Lin Yu-sheng, 88, philosopher and historian.
