= Xiaoyao Faction =

Derogatory term for more neutral parties during the Cultural Revolution in China

- Traditional Chinese: 逍遙派
- Simplified Chinese: 逍遥派
- Literal meaning: Faction of Bystanders
Transcriptions
Standard Mandarin
- Hanyu Pinyin: Xiāo Yáo Pài

The Xiaoyao Faction or Xiaoyao Pai (Chinese: 逍遥派), also known as Tea-drinking Faction (喝茶派), translated into English as Wanderers' Faction or Faction of Bystanders or Carefree Clique, is the illiterate or indifferent people who did not belong to any mass organization, who did not engage in any factional struggle, and who stayed away from radical movements during the Cultural Revolution. It included some cadres of the Chinese Communist Party and some less active Red Guards.

The term "xiaoyao" comes from Taoist Zhuangzi, and its original meaning in the phrase "xiaoyao pai" means having no conflicts with the world and being at ease. "Xiaoyao Pai" became a special term during the Cultural Revolution. They were spectators of the Cultural Revolution. At the beginning of the Cultural Revolution, there were very few members of the Xiaoyao Faction, but as the movement progressed, its membership gradually expanded.

The Xiaoyao Faction was used as a term of criticism at the time. It was considered a derogatory term, and members of the so-called Xiaoyao Faction were seen as dishonorable. However, since the Xiaoyao Faction was a group of "cold-eyed spectators" during the Cultural Revolution, they could obtain rational thinking and political wisdom that the "Rebel Faction" (造反派) could not. Because of this, a new group of independent spiritual bearers emerged from the original "Xiaoyao Faction".

Notable representatives of the Xiaoyao Faction included Li Yuanchao, Li Zehou, Yan Jiaqi, Liu Zaifu, Fang Lizhi, and Xu Liangying.

According to Xie Jingyi, Mao Zedong once commented: "What's wrong with the 'Xiaoyao faction'? They merely disagreed with your factionalism and factional fighting. You engaged in armed struggles, and they had no choice but to flee and seek refuge elsewhere. That kind of 'Xiaoyao faction' is excellent indeed. I fully support that kind of 'Xiaoyao faction'."

== See also ==
- Red Guards
- Cultural Revolution
- Apoliticism
