= Li Honglin =

Chinese scholar and official

Li Honglin (Chinese: 李洪林; September 10, 1925 – June 1, 2016) was a Chinese scholar and a senior official who served as the deputy director of the Theory Bureau of the Publicity Department of the Chinese Communist Party, as well as the President of Fujian Academy of Social Sciences. As an influential liberal official, Li played an instrumental role in the thought-liberation movement in the late 1970s and in the 1980s, and was called the "Thought Liberation Vanguard" and the "Flag Bearer for China's New Enlightenment movement".

== Biography ==
Li Honglin was born in Gaizhou, Liaoning in 1925. He graduated from Northwestern Agriculture College, and joined the Chinese Communist Party (CCP) in 1946 while in college.

Since 1948, Li worked at a number of universities, including Yan'an University, the Revolutionary University of Northwest in Xi'an, and the Northwest Normal College in Lanzhou. In 1954, he began a two-year study at the college of Marxism-Leninism in Beijing, which later became the Central Party School of the CCP. Since 1956, Li worked at the Political Research Office of the CCP Central Committee (中共中央政治研究室), until the beginning of Chinese Cultural Revolution (1966–1976) during which he was purged and persecuted. Li and his family were sent to the countryside at the shore of Bohai (near Tianjin) to do farm work and manual labor.

After the Cultural Revolution ended, Li was rehabilitated and held several key positions in Beijing since 1977, including the director of the Communist Party History Department of the National History Museum, deputy director of the Theory Bureau of the CCP Publicity Department, and President of the Fujian Academy of Social Sciences. He was also a visiting scholar and Henry Luce Fellow at Princeton University in the United States in 1986.

In the late 1970s and the 1980s, Li played an important role in China's New Enlightenment movement. In his famous talk "The Leader and the People" at the CCP Theory Conference in January 1979, Li argued that state leaders must be loyal to the people—not the other way around, as was commonly believed in China. In the same year, he published an article titled "No Forbidden Areas for Reading Books" in Dushu magazine, arguing that there should be no forbidden areas in reading books and calling for elimination of all restrictions on reading books.

Li was arrested during the Tiananmen Square Massacre in 1989 and was jailed for almost a year. He died in Beijing on June 1, 2016. Li Honglin's son, Li Shaomin, is a professor at the Old Dominion University.

== See also ==
- Boluan Fanzheng
- Reform and Opening
- Campaign against spiritual pollution
- Anti-bourgeois liberalization
