= Wang Yuanhua =

Wang Yuanhua (Chinese: 王元化; November 30, 1920 – May 9, 2008) was a Chinese scholar and literary theorist who was a leading figure in the New Enlightenment movement in mainland China in the 1980s. As an influential liberal intellectual in China, Wang was a professor at the East China Normal University, and served as the director of the Publicity Department of Shanghai Municipal Committee of the Chinese Communist Party (1983–1985). He founded the journal New Enlightenment in Shanghai in 1988.

== Biography ==
Wang Yuanhua was born to a Christian family in Wuchang, Hubei on November 30, 1920. Wang Yuanhua's parents got married in 1906, and his father, Wang Fangquan (王芳荃), obtained master's degree of education at the University of Chicago in the United States before returning to Tsinghua University in 1915 where he taught English; Wang Yuanhua thus spent his childhood in Beijing.

Wang joined the Chinese Communist Party (CCP) in 1938 and attended the Great China University from 1939–1941. In 1948, Wang married his wife Zhang Ke (张可). After the founding of the People's Republic of China in 1949, Wang served in the China Writers Association in Shanghai. He was seriously affected by the "Anti-Hu Feng Campaign" in 1955, even being expelled from the CCP.

After the Cultural Revolution in 1976, Wang was rehabilitated and returned to the CCP, serving as the director of the Publicity Department of Shanghai Municipal Committee of the Chinese Communist Party (1983–1985). He taught at the East China Normal University, and became an advocate for thought liberation and Marxist humanism in the 1980s and for Chinese liberalism in the 1990s. In particular, Wang played a leading role in the New Enlightenment movement in the 1980s and founded the New Enlightenment magazine in Shanghai in 1988. He was also recognized as an influential literary theorist.

Wang died on May 9, 2008, in Shanghai.

== See also ==
- Li Shenzhi
- Qian Zhongshu
