= The Pitfalls of Modernization =

1997 book by He Qinglian

- Author: He Qinglian
- Language: Chinese
- Publisher: Mirror Publishing House
- Publication date: 1997

The Pitfalls of Modernization (Chinese: 现代化的陷阱; pinyin: Xiàndàihuà de xiànjǐng), or Modernization's Pitfalls, Quagmire of Modernization, is a book about the problems of corruption and the reform and opening up taking place in the Mainland China. Written by He Qinglian, it exposes the corruption associated with the reform and opening up and offers a critique of the reform and opening up.

Initially entitled The Pitfalls of China, the book was originally published in Hong Kong in traditional Chinese in 1997 by the Mirror Publishing House. Tens of thousands of words considered sensitive were removed and the name was changed to The Pitfalls of Modernization before it was published by China Today Press in Beijing in January 1998. A revised edition of the book, entitled The Pitfall of China's Modernization, was published in November 2003 by Broad Press in the United States.

== Banned ==
The Pitfalls of Modernization predicted the dangers of China's economic reform at the time, such as the loss of state assets, unfair social distribution, and the social danger of peasants losing their land. The book was later banned in China.
