= Jin Guantao =

Chinese scholar

Jin Guantao (Chinese: 金观涛; born 1947) is a Chinese scholar who is currently the chair professor of the Department of Chinese Literature at the National Chengchi University in Taiwan. Jin was an influential figure in the New Enlightenment movement in the 1980s in mainland China, creating the Towards the Future Book Series with Bao Zunxin and others in 1984. In 1990, he founded the academic journal Twenty-First Century with his wife Liu Qingfeng at the Chinese University of Hong Kong.

== Biography ==
Jin Guantao was born in Yiwu, Zhejiang in 1947, and graduated from Peking University in 1970 with a degree in chemistry. During the Chinese Cultural Revolution (1966–1976), he became interested in humanities and social sciences.

Jin was an active figure during the New Enlightenment movement in mainland China in the 1980s, creating the popular Towards the Future Book Series with Bao Zunxin and others in 1984.

From an anti-Marxist perspective, Jin and Liu Qingfeng contended that Chinese history should be studied as a macro system according to the internal logic of its culture and values. In their view, Chinese civilization was an "ultrastable structure" with Confucianism as the main regulator of its "deep structure" and the root reason for its stability.

He served as the director of the Philosophy of Science in the Research Institute of the Chinese Academy of Sciences. In 1986, he spent a year as a visiting researcher at the University of Pennsylvania in the United States. In 1988, he became the main advisor to the influential TV documentary River Elegy.

After the Tiananmen Square Massacre in 1989, Jin moved to the Chinese University of Hong Kong where he founded the academic journal Twenty-First Century and built "the Database for the Study of Modern Chinese Thought (1830-1930)" with his wife Liu Qingfeng. Jin was a Senior Research Fellow of the Institute of Chinese Studies in the Chinese University of Hong Kong from 1989 to 2008.

Since 2009, Jin has been a professor at the National Chengchi University in Taiwan.
