= Broad Press =

Broad Press 博大出版社
- Status: Active
- Founded: February 24, 2003
- Country of origin: United States
- Headquarters location: Sunnyvale
- Official website: broadpressinc.com

Broad Press (Chinese: 博大出版社), Pinyin without tone marks is written as Boda chubanshe, also translated into English as Boda Press or Boda Publishing House, is a United States of America-based publishing house.

Broad Press was formally established on February 24, 2003, headquartered in Sunnyvale. Since its establishment, the press has published a series of books on truth, literature, and democratic thoughts based on the profound meaning of Chinese culture. Most of the works published by the press have been banned by the Chinese government.

== Important published books ==
- He Qinglian, The Pitfall of China's Modernization (中国现代化的陷阱), 2004.
- He Qinglian, Decoding the Secrets of Chinese History in the Second Half of the 20th Century (20世纪后半叶历史解密), 2004.
- Hu Ping, The Malady of Cynicism – Contemporary China's Mental Crisis (犬儒病:当代中国的精神危机), 2005.
- Ethan Gutmann, Losing the New China: A Story of American Commerce, Desire, and Betrayal, 2005.
- Single-edged Poison Word: A Critique of Chinese Nationalism, 2006.
- Liu Guokai, On People's Cultural Revolution (人民文革论), 2006.
- He Qinglian, Cheng Xiaonong, The Gains and Losses of China's Reform (中国改革的得与失), 2007.
