= Zhu Xueqin =

Chinese liberal intellectual (born 1952)

- Traditional Chinese: 朱學勤
- Simplified Chinese: 朱学勤
Transcriptions
Standard Mandarin
- Hanyu Pinyin: Zhū Xuéqín
- Wade–Giles: Chu Hsüeh-ch'in

Zhu Xueqin (born 1952) is a Shanghai-based Chinese historian and public intellectual. He is a major exponent of contemporary Chinese liberalism.

== Background ==
Born in Shanghai, Zhu was shaped in his eventual outlook by China's Cultural Revolution, when he was sent to rural Lankao County, Henan as a sent-down youth in 1970. In 1972, he was transferred to factory work.

After earning an MA in history in 1985 from Shaanxi Normal University, from 1985 to 1991 Zhu taught in the Air Force Politics Institute. In 1992, he graduated from Fudan University with a doctorate in history. Since 1991, he has been a Professor in the Department of History, Academy of Letters, Shanghai University.

He wrote an article entitled "1998: The Discourse of Liberalism," which spoke of a "resurfacing" of liberal thought and was published in the widely circulated Southern Weekly.

He has participated in many public activities, such as circular letter campaigns, in support of human rights, freedom of speech, and political reform.

An interview with him entitled "For a Chinese Liberalism" is published in the book One China, Many Paths.

== Bibliography ==
- Xueqin Zhu (2003). 道德理想囯的复灭 : 从卢梭到罗伯斯庇尔 = Daode lixiang guo de fumie : conglusuo dao Luobosibier /Dao de li xiang guo de fu mie : cong Lusuo dao Luobosi Bi'er = Daode lixiang guo de fumie : conglusuo dao Luobosibier [Downfall of the Moral Republic: from Rousseau to Robespierre]. Shanghai san lian xue shu wen ku (in Chinese). Shanghai Shi: Shanghai san lian shu dian. ISBN 978-7-5426-1837-5. OCLC 54384481.
- Zhongguoyu ouzhou wenhua jiaoliu zhi [Annals of Sino-European Cultural Exchange] (中国与欧洲文化交流志)
- Xueqin Zhu (2006). 书斋里的革命 / Shu zhai li de ge ming [The revolution in the study] (in Chinese). Kunming: Yunnan ren min chu ban she. ISBN 978-7-222-04765-5. OCLC 123909210.

== See also ==
- Gu Zhun
