= Toward the Future Series =

Set of books

- Original title: 走向未来丛书
- Country: China
- Language: Chinese
- Discipline: Social science and natural science
- Publisher: Sichuan People's Publishing House

Toward the Future Series (traditional Chinese: 走向未來叢書; simplified Chinese: 走向未来丛书), also translated into English as Walking Towards The Future Series or Toward the Future Book Series or Moving Toward the Future Series, is a set of books created in 1984 by Jin Guantao, Bao Zunxin, and others, and first published and printed by the Sichuan People's Publishing House in early 1984. In the late 1980s, Wang Qishan served as an editorial board member of the book series.

Toward the Future Series is the first popular series of Western new thoughts that had a widespread impact in mainland China. During the New Enlightenment movement in mainland China, the book series was dedicated to introducing Western thought and promoting science as a remedy for China's impeded modernization. It was of great significance to the enlightenment of Chinese thought in the 1980s.

Toward the Future Series was once banned by the Chinese Government, and was suspended after only 74 copies (planned to publish 100). After Deng Xiaoping's southern tour in 1992, the ban was lifted. The publication of the series began in 1984 and ended in 1988. This series of books involved various aspects of social science and natural science, including foreign language translations and original works.

The authors of the Toward the Future Series gathered a group of independent thinking intellectuals in China in the 1980s, representing the frontier thinking of China's ideological emancipation (思想解放) at that time. The series was quite popular when it was first published, and the People's Daily, the official media of Chinese Communist Party, also gave words of praise.

== Criticism ==
Some Chinese academics criticized that the Editorial Board of Toward the Future Series had a very close relationship with the official Reformational Faction (改革派) of the CCP at that time. They wanted to influence policies and were always debating with the authority, so the language they discussed was always semi-official. Moreover, because of the emphasis on practical function and popularity, the series of books later gradually appeared to be shoddy, which affected its influence.
