= Li Shenzhi =

Chinese social scientist (1923–2003)

Li Shenzhi (李慎之; 1923–2003) was a prominent Chinese social scientist and public intellectual. Long a trusted spokesperson of the Chinese Communist Party, he rose to become vice-president of the Chinese Academy of Social Sciences.

Dismissed from this position for blunt criticisms of the regime, he emerged in the 1990s as a powerful critic of authoritarianism, and a prominent exponent of Chinese liberalism. His death in 2003, which had been preceded by a series of widely circulated professions of his liberal commitment, prompted an outpouring of adulatory writings, securing his posthumous status as a champion of intellectual freedom under difficult circumstances.

== History ==
From 1941 to 1945 Li studied economics in Beijing (Yanjing University), and Shanghai (St. John's University). In November 1944, he participated in the Chinese Communist Party's secret "National Salvation Association of Democratic Youth."

Formally joining the Party in 1948, he became international editor-in-chief and deputy director of the Xinhua News Agency and later served as Premier Zhou Enlai's diplomatic secretary. From late 1978 to early 1980, Li was a member of the International Issues Writing Group established by the Central Committee. Meanwhile, he accompanied party supreme Deng Xiaoping on his visit to the US, serving as an adviser to the delegation.

He was transferred to the Chinese Academy of Social Sciences (CASS) in 1980 to set up the United States Research Institute, of which he was appointed Director in 1982.

In 1985 he became a vice president of CASS, retaining his directorship of the United States Research Institute. He was dismissed in 1990 due to blunt criticisms of the June Fourth events in Tiananmen and took medical retirement in 1995.

== Legacy ==
There has been controversy about Li's liberal-democratic credentials, focusing on his failure to completely break with the Communist Party. According to contemporary critics like Cao Changqing (a US-based journalist) and Zhong Weiguang (a scholar and writer based in Germany), he compares poorly with Eastern bloc liberals like Milovan Đilas (Djilas), or, in China, resolute non-collaborators like Chen Yinke and original, if tragically persecuted thinkers like Gu Zhun.

Xu Youyu responded to this view that conditions for Chinese intellectuals had been considerably harsher than for East Europeans like Djilas; to be fair, Li should be placed in comparison with other committed but "enlightened" communists like Zhou Yang and Yu Guangyuan.

== See also ==
- Chinese philosophy
- New Enlightenment
