= Shaomin Li =

Old Dominion University academic

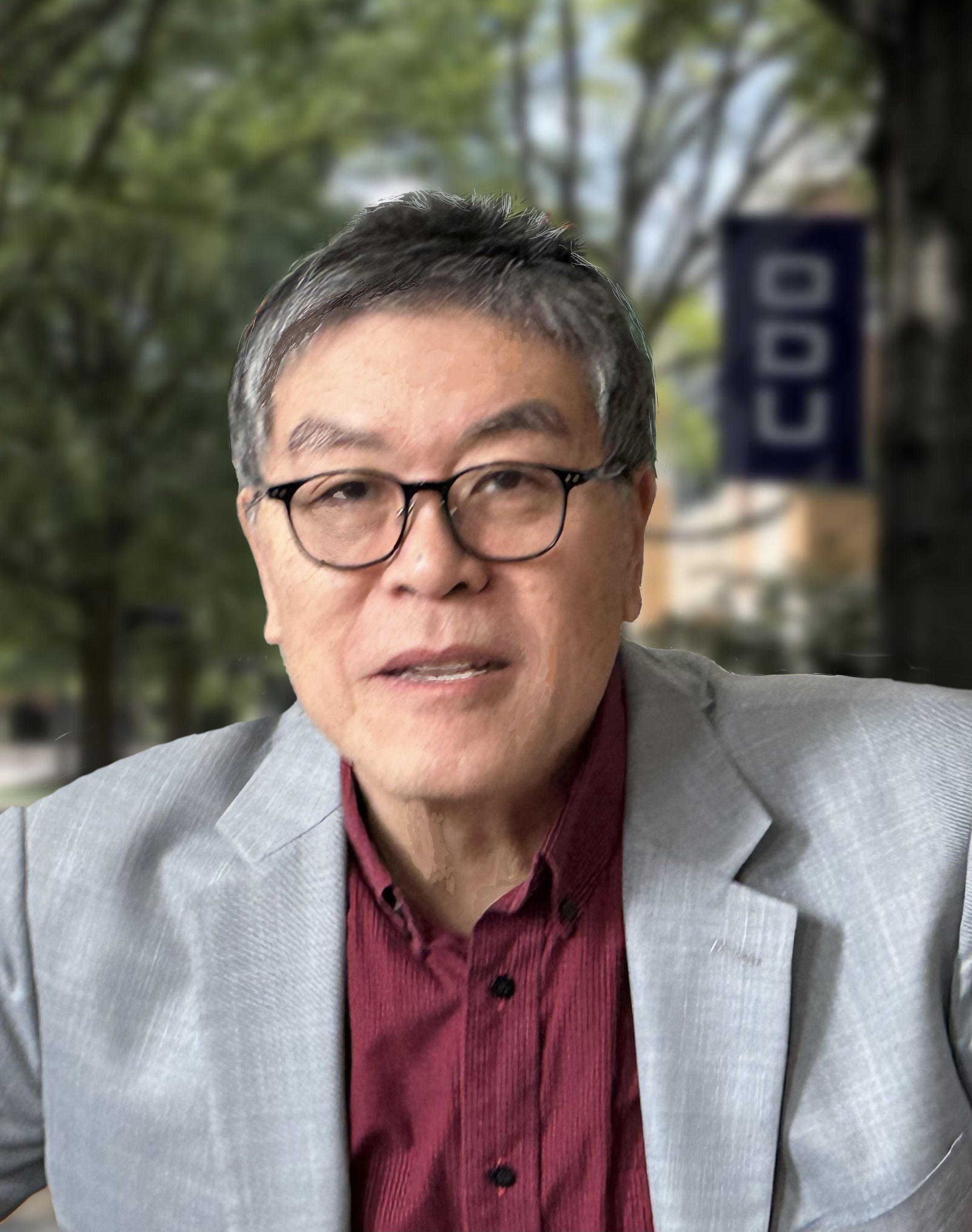
- Born: 1956 (age 69–70); Beijing, China
- Occupations: Sociologist, economist, academic, author, and artist

Academic background
- Education: B.A. in Economics; M.A. in Sociology; M.A. in Sociology; Ph.D. in Sociology
- Alma mater: Peking University; State University of New York University at Albany; Princeton University
- Thesis: (1988)

Academic work
- Institutions: Old Dominion University
- Notable works: The Rise of China, Inc.: How the Chinese Communist Party Transformed China into a Giant Corporation

Shaomin Li is a Chinese-American sociologist, economist, academic, author, and artist. He is a professor of management and international business, eminent scholar, and chair of the Department of Management at Old Dominion University (ODU).

Li's research focuses on the global business environment, with specific emphasis on governance dynamics in rapidly transforming societies. He has authored 18 books, including Together or Separate Checks, Carry On the Revolution to the End?: Propaganda Posters in China, and East Asian Business in the New World: Helping Old Economies Revitalize, and has published over 100 peer-reviewed articles. He received the Outstanding Faculty Award from The State Council of Higher Education for Virginia for his contributions to teaching, research, and public service.

Li is the Executive Editor of Modern China Studies.

== Education ==
Li obtained his baccalaureate degree in economics from Peking University in 1982 and went on to complete a master's degree in sociology from the State University of New York at Albany in 1984. He then received a master's degree in sociology from Princeton University in 1987 and a Ph.D. degree in sociology from Princeton University in 1988. Subsequently, in 1989, he served as a postdoctoral research fellow at the Fairbank Center for East Asian Research at Harvard University.

== Career ==
Following his postdoctoral research, Li began his academic career as a visiting professor at Hong Kong University of Science and Technology in 1993, and was appointed as an associate professor in the Faculty of Business at the City University of Hong Kong in 1996. Since 2005, he has been serving as a professor of Management and International Business at ODU and has also held an appointment as an Eminent Scholar there since 2012. Additionally, as of 2022, he has been holding an appointment as the chair of the Department of Management at Old Dominion University (ODU).

Li served as the director of the board and president of the Center for Modern China Foundation, United Nations Advisor to China in 1993, and as an expert witness at US Congress on China's reform. Co-founding iEast.com, he served as its CEO and also held the position of Director at AT&T EastGate Services in Berkeley Heights.

== Political and intellectual dialogue ==
Li has contributed to China's prosperity as a public intellectual and was among the pioneers who co-organized open letters for Chinese students, as highlighted in a feature by The New York Times. Moreover, he was the first to advocate for China to learn from Taiwan's political and economic reforms during the late 1980s, an idea supported by a piece published in The Wall Street Journal titled "So Taiwan Was Right All Along". In 1990, he co-founded the Center for Modern China Foundation and Modern China Studies and his donation record to the Tiananmen students in 1989 is now on permanent display in The June 4th Memorial Museum in New York. His advocacy for political and economic development in Taiwan, and his criticism of the Chinese Communist Party, led to his secret arrest in China in 2001. During those challenging times, he received a supporting letter from President Bush, further highlighting his work and beliefs.

== Art work ==
As an artist, Li's life took a transformative turn when he was assigned to paint a memorial portrait for Mao Zedong's funeral during his time in the army. Most of his artwork was focused on collecting and studying the propaganda posters, and the collection of these posters was exhibited at Chrysler Museum of Art. In the book, titled Carry On the Revolution to the End"?: Propaganda Posters in China he explored how Mao Zedong and the Chinese Communist Party used art, specifically propaganda posters, to shape and advance their revolution during the Cultural Revolution, while also analyzing the persuasive and distorted elements within these posters. Additionally, he served as a Political Cartoonist and presented his observations on how Western nations approach business with a focus on rule-oriented practices as opposed to relying on relations in East Asia through a cartoon-illustrated volume titled Together or Separate Checks? Why the East and West conduct business in different ways.

== Research ==
Li is most known for his work in the fields of China's demographics, governance environment, bribery and corruption, and economic behavior, which has been featured twice in The Economist. Additionally, his editorials have appeared in The Wall Street Journal, The Financial Times, The New York Times, and Forbes.

=== China's demographics and its rise ===
During his early career as a researcher, Li worked on the demographics of China, its socio-economic reforms, and its rise. He demonstrated the dire consequences of the one-child policy in China and proposed the idea of implementing a two-child policy to overcome them. In his book, The Rise of China, Inc., he explained how the Chinese Communist Party's absolute power and unique approach have transformed China into a corporate nation, challenging state-firm relationships, impacting multinational business strategies, and prompting counter measures against China's expansion. Together with Ansley J. Coale, he highlighted the impact of age misreporting in China on the accurate calculation of mortality rates, particularly at very high ages. He also developed a theory of institutional change to analyze China's transition towards capitalism and presented an institutional and environmental approach to evaluate firm performance in China's industrial market. In related research, he examined the impact of the relationship between Chinese governments and firms, as well as market liberalization on firm performance during China's economic transition through institutional changes such as decentralization of control, ownership restructuring, and industrial policy. In addition, he explored how state-owned enterprises and non-state firms in China deploy resources and formulate strategies, leading to different performances during the economic transition.

=== Governance environment, bribery and corruption ===
Another significant area of Li's research has been focused on analyzing the impact of the governance environment on the economic stability of a country. In 2003, he introduced a cost-based theoretical framework that compared relation-based and rule-based governance in strategic management and international business, offering insights into industry structure, management systems, innovation, and international flows, while providing policy recommendations. In his work, titled Managing International Business in Relation-Based versus Rule-Based Countries, he provided a summary of research spanning the past decade, focusing on how distinct governance environments at the national level influence business operations and management. He examined how the governance environment of a country affects the working relationships between expatriate managers and local employees in relation-based economies, the choice between direct and indirect investment, and trade flows.

Li also investigated several aspects of bribery and corruption and demonstrated how it affects the dynamics of the country at both economic and political levels, particularly in China. Exploring the globalization of bribery and corruption in weak institutional environments, his book, Bribery and Corruption in Weak Institutional Environment, offered insights into governance dynamics and the symbiotic relationship between corruption and dictatorships. He further examined a novel type of corruption called state-sponsored bribery by China, proposed policies to curb it, and argued that China will likely experience stagnation in both economic and political development due to the authoritarian trap caused by corruption and the absence of the rule of law. Furthermore, he presented a dynamic model to explain the bribery behavior of firms, considering factors such as the regulatory environment, firm behavior, and inter-firm competition in bribing.

== Awards and honors ==
- 2008 – Outstanding Faculty Award, Commonwealth of Virginia
- 2023 – Honorable Mention in Excellence in Opinion Writing, Society of Publishers in Asia

== Personal life ==
Li is married to Amy Li, and together they have a daughter named Diana. He is the son of Li Honglin, who played a significant role in the Chinese Communist Party to herald the post-Mao opening up and reforms in the 1970s and 1980s.

== Bibliography ==
=== Selected books ===
- Modern China Studies: Contemporary Chinese Visual Culture and Cultural Translation (2015) ISBN 978-1-5147-5923-3
- Modern China Studies: China as a Potential Superpower (Modern China Studies) (2016) ISBN 978-1-5396-9069-6
- "Carry On the Revolution to the End"?: Propaganda Posters in China (2018) ISBN 978-1-9835-4828-4
- Bribery and Corruption in Weak Institutional Environments: Connecting the Dots from a Comparative Perspective (2019) ISBN 978-1-108-49289-8
- The Rise of China, Inc.: How the Chinese Communist Party Transformed China into a Giant Corporation (2022) ISBN 978-1-316-51387-3

=== Selected articles ===
- Pan, Y., Li, S., & Tse, D. K. (1999). The impact of order and mode of market entry on profitability and market share. Journal of International Business Studies, 30, 81–103.
- Judge, W., Li, S., & Pinsker, R. (2010). National adoption of international accounting standards: An institutional perspective. Corporate Governance: An International Review, 18(3), 161–174.
- Park, S. H., Li, S., & Tse, D. K. (2006). Market liberalization and firm performance during China's economic transition. Journal of International Business Studies, 37, 127–147.
- Lattemann, C., Fetscherin, M., Alon, I., Li, S., & Schneider, A. M. (2009). CSR communication intensity in Chinese and Indian multinational companies. Corporate Governance: An International Review, 17(4), 426–442.
- Li, S., Li, S., & Zhang, W. (2000). The road to capitalism: Competition and institutional change in China. Journal of Comparative Economics, 28(2), 269–292.
