= Liu Gangji =

Chinese aesthetician

Liu Gangji (Chinese: 刘纲纪; 17 January 1933 – 1 December 2019) was a Chinese aesthetician, calligrapher, historian, painter, and philosopher. He was considered a founder of the study of the history of Chinese aesthetics. He was a distinguished professor and Director of the Institute of Aesthetics of Wuhan University. He also served as Vice President of the China Aesthetics Society.

== Biography ==
Liu was born on 17 January 1933 in Haoying Village, Puding County, Guizhou, Republic of China. He graduated from the Department of Philosophy of Peking University in 1956, then spent two more years there studying aesthetics.

Liu joined the faculty of Wuhan University on the invitation of President Li Da, and spent his entire career there. He was promoted to lecturer in 1963, to associate professor in 1978, and to professor in 1982. He was named a distinguished professor in 2006. He was a longtime director of the Institute of Aesthetics at Wuhan University, and also served as Vice President of the China Aesthetics Society.

Liu spent decades studying Marxist aesthetics, history of Chinese aesthetics, history of Chinese calligraphy and painting, and Chinese traditional thoughts and culture. He and Li Zehou co-edited the two-volume History of Chinese Aesthetics (中国美学史), published in 1984 and 1987. Considered the foundational work in the field, the book is described as "monumental" despite being unfinished.

In The Spreading and Influence of German Aesthetics in China, he argued that modern Chinese aesthetics have largely resulted from the propagation of German idealism, through the translated writings of thinkers such as Alexander Baumgarten, Immanuel Kant, and Karl Marx. In 1999, he was invited to teach as a visiting professor at the University of Trier and Heidelberg University in Germany, and the book was translated into German and published by the University of Trier Press.

Liu was also a painter and calligrapher and published Collected Paintings and Calligraphy of Liu Gangji in 2012, which includes 269 of his works. The Hubei Institute of Fine Arts held his personal art exhibition in the same year with more than 150 works. He has been described as "an artist among philosophers, and a philosopher among artists".

== Selected books ==
- Gong Xian (龚贤, 1962)
- Huang Shen (黄慎, 1979)
- A Brief Discourse on the Aesthetics of Calligraphy (书法美学简论, 1979)
- Dialogues on Aesthetics (美学对话, 1983)
- History of Chinese Aesthetics (中国美学史: Volume 1 in 1984, Volume 2 in 1987), with Li Zehou
- Aesthetics and Philosophy (美学与哲学, 1986)
- The Philosophy of Art (艺术哲学, 1986)
- Liu Xie (刘勰, 1989)
- The Spreading and Influence of German Aesthetics in China (德国美学在中国的传播与影响, 1991)
- The Aesthetics of I Ching (周易美学, 1992)
- Wen Zhengming (文征明, 1996)
- Traditional Culture, Philosophy, and Aesthetics (传统文化、哲学与美学, 1997)
- Chinese Calligraphy, Paintings, Art and Aesthetics (中国书画、美术与美学, 2006)
- Collected Works of Liu Gangji (刘纲纪文集, 2009)
- Collected Paintings and Calligraphy of Liu Gangji (刘纲纪书画集, 2012)

== Personal life ==
Liu was married to Sun Jialan (孙家兰).

He died on 1 December 2019 in Wuhan, aged 86.
