= Wen Yuankai =

Chinese scholar and social activist

Wen Yuankai (Chinese: 温元凯; born 1946) is a Chinese scholar, social activist and financial investor. He was a prominent figure during the New Enlightenment movement in mainland China in the 1980s, actively supporting the "Reform and Opening" as a professor at the University of Science and Technology of China. He also served as a deputy director of the Anhui Provincial Department of Education. Wen shifted his focus to financial investment in the 1990s and founded his own consulting firm in China.

== Biography ==
Wen Yuankai was born in Wuxi, Jiangsu in 1946. He attended Nanjing University and studied chemistry, but was persecuted during the Cultural Revolution while in college. After graduation in 1968, he was sent to work at a plastic factory in Shaoxing, Zhejiang, where he joined the Chinese Communist Party. In the summer of 1973, he received recommendations and began working at the University of Science and Technology of China (USTC). In 1977, at the beginning of the Boluan Fanzheng period, he made a suggestion to Deng Xiaoping to resume the National College Entrance Examination which was cancelled during the decade of Cultural Revolution (1966–1976).

In 1980, he went to France and spent some time studying quantum biology. After returning to China, Wen became an active leader in promoting the reform and opening up and thought liberation as a professor at the USTC, primarily by giving lectures at hundreds of universities, publishing books on the reforms of China, and so on.

In 1992, he became a visiting scholar at the California Institute of Technology in the United States, but soon shifted his focus to finance and began working at Wall Street in 1993. He returned to China later and has served as the Chief Adviser of Kuaile Nongjia as well as the chairman of the Board (Training Center) for Beijing Nanyang Linde Consulting.
