= Twenty-First Century =

Hong Kong academic journal

The Twenty-First Century is a Hong Kong intellectual magazine published bimonthly, with a high standard of contributions both in the social sciences and the humanities, which played an important role in Chinese intellectual life since the early 1990s.

== Overview ==
After the Tiananmen Square protests of 1989, the intellectual scene within mainland China was enervated, both by the effects of political conditions on the possibilities for discourse and by a sizable intellectual exodus to the West. Founded by Jin Guantao and his wife Liu Qingfeng, theTwenty-First Century was first published in October 1990. At first, it was the only magazine available to the thinkers of the new diaspora. It therefore became a very important site for debate (for example, on conservatism and radicalism in 20th-century Chinese thought, or on China's state capacity), though it was difficult to obtain copies in the mainland.

Aside from its importance in the maintenance and the progress of Chinese intellectual discourse during this time, The Twenty-First Century is also of historical importance as a document of the first stages of the internationalization of Chinese intellectual life during the 1990s.
