= Salvation overwhelmed enlightenment =

Interpretation of Chinese history

- Initiator: Vera Schwarcz
- Origin: The Chinese Enlightenment: Intellectuals and the Legacy of the May Fourth Movement of 1919

Salvation overwhelmed enlightenment
- Simplified Chinese: 救亡压倒启蒙
- Traditional Chinese: 救亡壓倒啟蒙
Transcriptions
Standard Mandarin
- Hanyu Pinyin: Jiùwáng yādǎo qǐméng

Salvation overwhelmed enlightenment (simplified Chinese: 救亡压倒启蒙; traditional Chinese: 救亡壓倒啟蒙), also known as "national salvation crushed enlightenment" or the "country's salvation suffocated the enlightenment", is a viewpoint put forward by Li Zehou in the mid-1980s (the New Enlightenment period) in an article entitled Double Variation on Enlightenment and National Salvation. However, American scholar Vera Schwarcz argued that she was in fact the one who raised this idea before Li.

== Definition ==
In Double Variation on Enlightenment and National Salvation, Li Zehou deconstructed modern Chinese history with the two different themes of intellectual history: "enlightenment" and "salvation". In the process of modern Chinese history, cultural enlightenment task of "anti-feudalism" was "interrupted" by the theme of national salvation, and the revolutionary and salvation movements not only failed to continue to advance the work of cultural enlightenment, but were also "quietly infiltrated by the old traditional ideology", which eventually caused the Cultural Revolution to "push Chinese consciousness into the desperate situation of full resurrection of feudal traditions". Briefly, national crises and collective causes eventually submerged the values of individual freedom advocated by the protagonists of the Enlightenment.

In 1989, Li again clearly pointed out that the direction of modern Chinese history in the twentieth century was that "salvation overwhelmed enlightenment, and the peasant revolution overwhelmed modernization". He further argued that if salvation overwhelmed enlightenment during the revolutionary era, then today enlightenment is salvation, and the only way to make the country rich and strong and modern is to fight for democracy, freedom, reason, and the rule of law.

According to the contemporary Chinese historian Qin Hui, "salvation overwhelmed enlightenment" actually means nationalism overwhelmed liberalism, and helped the rise of Marxism and Leninism.
