= Modern China Studies =

Modern China Studies 当代中国研究
- Editor-in-chief: Shaomin Li; Wang Yuan; Yang Bin
- Former editors: Cheng Xiaonong
- First issue: 1990
- Country: United States
- Based in: Princeton, New Jersey
- Website: modernchinastudies.org
- ISSN: 2160-0295 (print); 2160-0317 (web)
- OCLC: 31685548

Modern China Studies (traditional Chinese: 當代中國研究; simplified Chinese: 当代中国研究), abbreviated as MCS, also translated into English as Contemporary China Studies, is a United States-based peer-reviewed international journal focusing on discussing contemporary issues and current affairs in the People's Republic of China, published biannually featuring articles in either Chinese or English. The journal is based in Princeton, New Jersey.

Modern China Studies was founded by Shaomin Li (李少民) in 1990 in Princeton University, its content mainly covers the fields of politics, economy, law, society, culture, international relations, environmental protection, modern history and humanities. Submissions to the journal will undergo a double-blind peer-review process.

== See also ==
- China Journal of Democracy
