= He Qinglian =

Chinese economist

- 何清涟
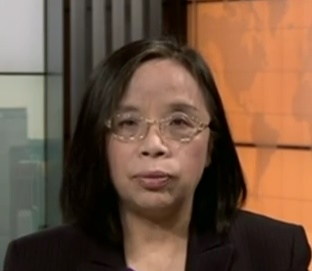
- Born: January 1, 1956 (age 70); Shaoyang, Hunan, China
- Education: MS Economics
- Alma mater: Hunan Normal University, Fudan University
- Occupation: Writer
- Spouse: Cheng Xiaonong

He Qinglian (simplified Chinese: 何清涟; traditional Chinese: 何清漣; pinyin: Hé Qīnglián) is a Chinese author, economist, and exiled dissident, known for her critical view of the Chinese Communist Party and for her support of right-wing Republicans in the United States.

== Biography ==
She was born in Shaoyang, Hunan, China, in 1956. She studied history in Hunan Normal University from 1979 to 1983. In 1988 she received a master's degree in economics from Fudan University in Shanghai, China. She worked in universities in Hunan and Guangdong for several years. Later she became a newspaper editor in Shenzhen, Guangdong. She wrote many articles and several books on Chinese society and the Chinese economy. The Pitfalls of Modernization, her most famous book, sold over 100,000 copies in China and won acclaim from both the public and economists. She argues in Pitfalls that, as power has devolved to local government, local officials who at first favored reform later came to oppose further reform which might limit their discretion and so make it harder to trade power for money and money for power. In the latter part of Pitfalls she also discussed the revival of clan power in southern provinces such as Guangdong and Fujian. Her articles, which point to deep structural problems and declare that thoroughgoing political reform will be necessary if economic reform is to succeed, displeased some Chinese government officials. Consequently, she received more and more pressure in China, and on June 14, 2001, she left home and fled abroad. She now lives in the United States.

He Qinglian's articles often appear in the Chinese language press outside of China. Her book Media Control in China (中国政府如何控制媒体) was published online in Chinese (with an English language summary) by Human Rights in China in 2004 and serialized on the website of a scholarly Chinese language quarterly based in New Jersey, Modern China Studies (当代中国研究). A revised and expanded edition was published in Taipei by Liming Cultural Enterprises in 2006.
