= One China, Many Paths =

2005 collection of essays by Chaohua Wang

- Cover art of the first edition
- Author: Chaohua Wang (editor)
- Language: English
- Genre: Political theory
- Publisher: Verso Books
- Publication date: 2005
- Publication place: England
- Media type: Print (book)
- Pages: 288
- ISBN: 1-84467-535-1
- OCLC: 57637530

One China, Many Paths, edited by Chaohua Wang. A collection of essays by Chinese thinkers, reflecting the new thinking that developed in the 1990s. Both Chinese liberal and Chinese New Left views are represented, along with some views that do not fit either category.
