= Xu Jilin =

Chinese historian

Xu Jilin (born 1957; Chinese: 许纪霖; pinyin: Xú Jìlín) is a Chinese historian. He is a professor of history at East China Normal University, and specializes in 20th century Chinese intellectual history.

== Early life ==
Born in 1957 in Shanghai, Xu Jilin dropped out of school and became a librarian because of the Cultural Revolution. As time passed, he eventually decided to pursue further education after passing National Higher Education Entrance Examination. He studied policy at East China Normal University.

== Career ==
In 1982 Xu graduated with a Bachelor's degree. He became a university lecturer. From 1997 to 2003, Xu Jilin traveled to three universities as a visiting professor and visiting scholar: the Harvard–Yenching Institute, the National University of Singapore, and the University of Tokyo. In 2003, he returned to the East China Normal University where he continued his career.

Xu Jilin serves on the editorial board of the journal Twenty-First Century Bimonthly, published by Chinese University of Hong Kong.

== Views ==
Xu is a Third Way liberal who disavows what he terms the political extremes. He believes in "small government, big society", and criticized the statist, conservative intellectual current of the Chinese New Left.

== Selected works in English ==
- Xu, Jilin (2000). "The Fate of an Enlightenment: Twenty Years in the Chinese Intellectual Sphere (1978–98)" (PDF). East Asian History (20). Translated by Barmé, Geremie R.; Davies, Gloria: 169–186.
- ——— (2004). "What Future for Public Intellectuals?: The specialisation of knowledge, the commercialisation of culture and the emergence of post-modernism characterise China in the 1990s". China Perspectives (52). Translated by Black, Michael: 18–30.
- ——— (2012). "Social Darwinism in modern China". Journal of Modern Chinese History. 6 (2): 182–197. doi:10.1080/17535654.2012.718605.
- ——— (2018). Rethinking China's Rise: A Liberal Critique. Translated by Ownby, David. Cambridge: Cambridge University Press. ISBN 978-1108470759.
