= Farewell to Revolution =

1995 book by Li Zehou and Liu Zaifu

Farewell to Revolution: Looking Back Upon China of the Twentieth Century
- Author: Li Zehou, Liu Zaifu
- Language: Traditional Chinese
- Genre: Political theory, revolution
- Publisher: Cosmos Books Ltd.
- Publication date: 1995
- Publication place: Hong Kong
- Media type: Print (book)
- Pages: 312
- ISBN: 9789622578111

Farewell to Revolution
- Traditional Chinese: 告別革命：回望二十世紀中國
- Simplified Chinese: 告别革命：回望二十世纪中国
Transcriptions
Standard Mandarin
- Hanyu Pinyin: Gàobié gémìng: Huí wàng èrshí shìjì zhōngguó
Yue: Cantonese
- Jyutping: gou3 bit6 gaak3 ming6: wui4 mong6 ji6 sap6 sai3 gei2 zung1 gwok3

Farewell to Revolution: Looking Back Upon China of the Twentieth Century (Chinese: 告別革命：回望二十世紀中國) is a book written by Chinese philosopher Li Zehou and Liu Zaifu, and published by Cosmos Books Ltd. in Hong Kong.

The text criticises China's revolutionary path and favors incremental reform. Its publication prompted significant debate between different schools of political thought. It led to increasing divisions between liberal intellectuals and New Left intellectuals over the legacy of the New Enlightenment.

== Content ==
Li and Liu argue in this book that class conflict will always exist, and should be solved via class reconciliation rather than class struggle, and thus oppose orthodox Marxism. Li and Liu advocate "reform rather than revolution" and claim that the revolution has been "screwed up". They say that if China had followed the path of Kang Youwei and Liang Qichao's constitutional reform, China might have gotten better results; and propose the "four-stage agenda" of China's modernization as development of economy, individual liberty, social justice, and democracy. Despite being questioned about their opposition to all revolutions, in a series of subsequent interviews they expressed their opposition only to the "violent French type revolution" and their support for the "glorious British type revolution".

== Reception and impact ==
The book has been highly controversial since its publication. Many scholars have described Li's views in the book as "cultural conservatism" or "neoconservatism". Chinese officials and some scholars have even called Li's claims in the book "historical nihilism".

The book also led to the increasing divergence of perspective between liberal intellectuals and New Left intellectuals over the New Enlightenment legacy, as New Left intellectuals viewed the book as a veiled neoliberal effort to depoliticise radical thinking and legitimate end-of-history liberal triumphalism.
