= Dushu =

- Discipline: Literature, Philosophy
- Language: Mandarin

Publication details
- History: 1979-present
- Publisher: Sanlian Press (China)
- Frequency: Monthly

Standard abbreviations
- ISO 4: Dushu

Indexing
- OCLC no.: 591903297

Dushu (Chinese: 读书; pinyin: Dúshū, Reading in Chinese) is a monthly Chinese literary magazine which has great influence on Chinese intellectuals. It is based in Beijing.

== History ==
The journal was first published in April 1979 with its lead article entitled "No Forbidden Zone in Reading." The first editor came from the Commercial Press in Beijing, before moving into the hands of Fan Yong of Sanlian Press the next year. Sanlian was also the press which published the periodical. Articles introduced many ideas from modern Western philosophy (e.g. Nietzsche, Heidegger, Cassirer, Marcuse, Sartre, and Freud) as well as post-colonial theories such as Orientalism. Circulation rose from 50,000 to 80,000 in the first five or six years. However, during these early years until as late as 1988, there was much secrecy around who edited Dushu aside from it being established by a number of "publishers."

In 1996, Wang Hui and Huang Ping became executive editors. The magazine has tended to raise issues not previously discussed and carries a wide range of political opinions, including the views of Chinese liberals, the Chinese New Left, and generally anti-neoliberal views. In 2007, the CCP propaganda department ordered the publisher to dismiss Wang and Huang, a decision that weakened the New Left in China.

== See also ==
- New Enlightenment movement
