= Gao Ertai =

Gao Ertai, (born 1935) is a Chinese writer, calligrapher and artist who was born near Nanjing. He is well known in China for his contributions to aesthetic theory and teaching.

Gao was detained and sentenced to forced labour by the Chinese Government due to his work and has been in and out the camp over twenty years. Finally, his wife Maya and he escaped to Hong Kong and now they live in Las Vegas in the United States. He has published four collections of essays on beauty and freedom in Chinese. Parts of In Search of My Homeland, biography and memoir of his years of persecution, have been translated and published in French and German.

Gao is currently a visiting scholar at the University of Nevada at Las Vegas, and, in the past, he taught at Lanzhou University, Sichuan Normal University, Nankai University, and Nanjing University.

== Selected works ==
- On Beauty (1957)
- The Struggle of Beauty and Beauty (1987)
- The Symbol of Freedom (1987)
- In Search of My Homeland (2009)
