= Liu Junning =

Chinese political scientist (born 1961)

- 劉軍寧
- Born: 1961 (age 64–65); Anhui, China

Philosophical work
- Era: 20th Century Philosophy
- School: Liberalism in China
- Main interests: Political philosophy

Liu Junning (simplified Chinese: 刘军宁; traditional Chinese: 劉軍寧; pinyin: Liú Jūnníng; born 1961) is a Chinese political scientist and one of the most prominent liberal voices inside Chinese academia. He was known for his studies on modern European classical liberalism as well as conservatism. He is currently a researcher of Institute of Chinese Culture, a subsidiary of China's Ministry of Culture.

Liu is an opponent of what are called Asian values, including the view that Asia should take a different route of political development outside of the tradition of liberal democracy, seen as a Western principle. Liu believes liberalism is not simply a Western value, but should be something universal. He is also an admirer of American philosopher Ayn Rand. He does not support direct democracy, and views Jean-Jacques Rousseau as its primary proponent. He embraces classical liberalism, economic liberalism, market economy and was sponsered by the Cato Institute. He also supports a limited government and is influenced by Milton Friedman. He is also considered to be a libertarian.

In 2001, Liu penned an article calling for reform in China and was expelled from Chinese Academy of Social Science and prohibited from travelling abroad. In 2009, the authority of Chinese Communist Party gave warnings to Liu along with two other intellectuals for their political advocacy contrary to the current regime and their signature on Charter 08.
