= Chen Wen-min =

Taiwanese film director and screenwriter (1920–2022)

Chen, Wen-min
- Born: 1920; Taiwan, Japan
- Died: 11 February 2022 (aged 102); Hawaii, U.S.
- Occupation(s): Film director, screenwriter, producer
- Years active: 1957–1961

Chen, Wen-min / Chen, Fen in original(1920–2022, Chinese: 陳文敏/陳粉) was the first female director in Taiwan, screenwriter, and producer. She established Daming Cinema in 1955 and filmed some movies, such as Xue Ren-Gui and Liu Jin-Hua, Boundless Bird, Suffering Love, and Second Degree in the following years.

== Early life ==
Chen, Wen-min was born in Sanchong District in Taiwan. When she was little, she asked her parents to let her study Japanese and arithmetic in the public school set up by the Japanese colonial government. At the age of 15, she got to know some Chinese novels like Legend of the General Who Never Was, General Father General Son (薛丁山征西), and Romance of Southern Tang (南唐演義), leading to her passion for being a director. In 1940, before she became a director, she and her husband set up KuoKuang Iron Factory and Daming Film Studio. Also, she used some money to invest in iron factories, banks, Japanese cuisine, noodles, theatres, and so on. Moreover, her elder brother Chen, Long-de (陳隆德) was the most famous developer of the electroplating and gold plating industry. She and her brother's business were both important industrial bloodlines in Sanchong's development.

After she gave birth to her seventh child in 1954, she founded the Daming Theatre, which is the fifth cinema in Sanchong District. In the beginning, she was not just a director, she was also a screenwriter, film producer, and film editor. It was said that when the cinema was building up, her husband got injured in a car accident, she was worried and went to the hospital to look after him. While she was looking after her husband, she asked some managers to assist for the cinema. However, when she went back to the cinema, she found that the managers had failed to do their jobs, and she needed money to pay debts and couldn't afford the theatre. Apart from that, she was unable to pay the hospital bill. In order to cover her debts, she created the movie Beggar Chao's Son-in-law (乞丐招女婿) in order to gain financial stability. However, she could not earn enough benefits through the movie. As a result, she was forced to close the cinema. In 2022, she was reported to have passed away in Hawaii.

== Film career ==
Daming Cinema was established in 1955 when the first Taiwanese movie came out. It became the fifth cinema in Sanchong District after Tiantai Cinema, Jinguo Cinema, Jindu Cinema, and Jianguo Cinema. To maintain the budget, Chen not only served as the manager of the cinema, but also started to orchestrate the film showtimes herself. Before the film selection, she read the detailed information carefully and did research on the synopsis of those films, which cultivated her ability in film selection from some aspects, such as characterization, plots, and inspiration of the movie, and discovered target audience's preferences. In the same period, she obtained the right of public transmission to the famous American movie, Gone with the wind, and made Daming Cinema gain more visibility and popularity in public.

Later in 1956, Chen and her husband Lin, Xin-quan(林辛全) established Taiwan Daming Film Production Unit (臺灣大明電影製片社) and produced their own film. The first film was called Female Enemies (女性的仇人), whose script was written by her. The main theme of the film was to explain why women should act more cautiously in society as compared to men. Female Enemies was released at four cinemas in 1958. In order to promote this movie, she held a quiz with twelve golden watches as a prize, which made the day of showing of Female Enemies last for twenty-one days.

After the success of their debut, her husband invited Shau Luo-hui (邵羅輝), a famous director at that time, to direct the second film, Xue Ren-Gui and Liu Jin-Hua (薛仁貴與柳金花), written by Chen. During the process of making the film, Chen, Wen-min and Shao, Lou-hui held different opinions to the plots of the film. In the end, Shau decided to walk away from the crew with the details, which forced Chen to complete the film by herself. After the next few months, she shot the sequel of Xue Ren-Gui and Liu Jin-Hua.

In 1957, to cost down the personnel budget, Chen decided to direct, produce, edit, and dub her first film Boundless Bird (茫茫鳥). The cast of Boundless Bird subsumed famous actors Bai Rong (白蓉), Hu Tou (戽斗), and Jin Feng (金楓). Therefore, after Boundless Bird was released, she became the first Taiwanese film director. In the same year, Chen, Wen-min filmed her subsequent movie, Suffering Love (苦戀) in a tear-jerker style. On November 1, 1957, the first Taiwanese Film Festival was held at the International House of Taipei. There were 33 films selected, including Female Enemies, Boundless Bird, and Suffering Love.

In 1959, due to the fact that the Film Industry in Taiwan had slumped, and Chen, Wen-min's husband was seriously injured in a car accident, she gave out the operation of the Cinema for a while. When Chen Wen-min resumed the operation, it was about to close down. In order to resuscitate the dying business, she directed Beggar Chao's Son-in-law (乞食招子婿). Yet, owing to the influence of Japanese smuggled movies, cinemas refused to air Beggar Chao’s Son-in-law. After the movie was released, it was unlikely to obtain sufficient return from the revenue due to the existing cost. Therefore, this setback ended her directing career.

== Filmography ==
Year	English title	Original title	Director	Screenwriter
1957	Female Enemies	女性的仇人	No	Yes
1957	Xue Ren-Gui and Liu Jin-Hua	薛仁貴與柳金花	No	Yes
1957	Xue Ren-Gui Travels East	薛仁貴征東	No	Yes
1957	Boundless Bird	茫茫鳥	Yes	Yes
1957	Suffering Love	苦戀	Yes	Yes
1958	Peasant Girl	農家女	Yes	Yes
1958	Beauty Lures Man	妖姬奪夫	Yes	Yes
1959	Tears of a Wife	可憐的媳婦	Yes	Yes
1959	Beggar Chao's Son-in-law	乞丐招子婿	Yes	Yes
1959	The Wicked Concubine Kills Her Own Son	惡妾誤殺親生子	Yes	Yes
1960	The Reformed Husband	母子含冤記	Yes	
1961	Second Degree	二度梅	No	Yes

== Films ==
Boundless Bird

Boundless Bird (茫茫鳥), also known as The Reformed Husband (母子含冤記), was a 1957 Taiwanese domestic ethics film co-directed by Chen, Wen-Min and Chen, Yi-Sing. It held the distinction of being the first Taiwanese-language film directed by a female director. Also, it was Chen, Wen-Min's first Taiwanese-language fashion movie. At the 1957 Golden Horse Film Festival in Taiwan, three films by Chen, Wen-Min were selected: Boundless Bird, Suffering Love (苦戀), and Female Enemies (女性的仇人).

The story revolved around a man named Li, Zheng-Xiong, who inherited his father's iron factory and subsequently became corrupted. He took a barmaid named Yu-Sian as his concubine and neglected his wife.He even drove his younger brother Li, Zheng-Yi out of the house. One day, while Li, Zheng-Xiong was away on business, Yu-Sian was caught having an affair with the factory manager by his son, Li, Long, so she wanted to harm him. Fortunately, he was rescued by Li, Zheng-Yi. When Li, Zheng-Xiong came back, Li, Zheng-Yi exposed Yu-Sian's adultery. He became furious and shot her. Before she died, she stabbed the factory manager as atonement. This movie addressed a significant issue regarding inter-class romantic relationships. It promoted the idea of teenagers being able to freely pursue relationships with individuals from any social backgrounds and also emphasized the importance of parental support. Additionally, the film delved into themes of marital morality, shedding light on prevalent issues within Taiwanese society during that time, such as social inequality and domestic violence.

In the initial stages of the film's creation, serial pictures (also known as linked pictures) were utilized to develop the movie storyboards. The film predominantly used medium shots and panoramas to narrate the story, while combining natural and artificial light sources in order to reduce costs. Chen, Wen-Min was renowned for her insightful social commentary and meticulous character development. Her unique filmmaking approach involved expertly using the language of the camera to create a subtle and authentic portrayal of emotions, allowing the audience to deeply empathize with the characters' inner turmoil and pain. She also placed great emphasis on the minutiae, using subtle actions and dialogue to unveil the characters' personalities and emotions, thereby rendering them more genuine and relatable to the audience.
