= Chang Wen-i =

Taiwanese entrepreneur and politician (1948–2022)

Member of the Legislative Yuan
- In office 1 February 1993 – 31 January 2002
- Constituency: Taichung County

Personal details
- Born: 15 November 1948
- Died: 15 June 2022 (aged 73) Taichung, Taiwan
- Party: Kuomintang
- Education: Taichung Municipal Cingshuei Senior High School
- Occupation: Entrepreneur

Chang Wen-i (Chinese: 張文儀; 15 November 1948 – 15 June 2022) was a Taiwanese politician.

A member of the Kuomintang, he served in the second National Assembly, followed by three consecutive terms representing Taichung County in the Legislative Yuan from 1993 to 2002.

In 2004, Chang was charged with fraud relating to an insider trading case that involved Tseng Cheng-jen, a former executive of the Kuangsan Enterprise Group and Taichung Commercial Bank, as well as former legislative colleague Liu Sung-pan. Chang left for China in August 2004, and was placed on Taiwan's wanted list in December, but not repatriated from Macau until August 2007. Chang had been previously convicted on charges of forgery in September 2004, and sentenced to one year in prison, from which he was paroled in May 2009. Further appeals by Chang were heard by the Supreme Court in July 2009, which ruled that he had violated the Securities and Exchange Law, and sentenced him to six years imprisonment, as well as deprivation of his civil rights for three years.

Chang died in Taichung on 15 June 2022 at the age of 73.
