= Contemporary Chinese Thought and the Question of Modernity =

1997 article by Wang Hui

"Contemporary Chinese Thought and the Question of Modernity" (Chinese: 当代中国的思想状况与现代性问题) is an influential article of around 35,000 characters in length by Chinese intellectual historian and literary scholar Wang Hui, written in 1994 and published in left-wing literature journal Tianya (天涯) in 1997. An English translation by Rebecca E. Karl appeared in a volume of Social Text titled "Intellectual Politics in Post-Tiananmen China" (1998).

The article became the subject of intense debate and attention both for its methodology—an unusually socio-historical approach to intellectual history—and its expressed politics, which are critical of capitalist modernity. According to academic Yue Gang, it is "a cornerstone in the transformation of contemporary Chinese thought" and "has become a benchmark for the New Left."

== See also ==
- Chinese intellectualism
