= World Economic Herald =

Newspaper based in Shanghai, China

World Economic Herald 世界经济导报
- Editor: Qin Benli
- Founded: 1980
- Ceased publication: 1989
- Language: Chinese
- Headquarters: Shanghai, China

The World Economic Herald (Chinese: 世界经济导报; pinyin: Shìjiè Jīngjì Dǎobào) was a newspaper based in Shanghai, China. It was founded in 1980 by Qin Benli (钦本立), who acted as its chief editor until its closure by the Chinese Communist Party Shanghai government in May 1989, after the 1989 Tiananmen Square protests and massacre.

The Herald gained a reputation for being one of the most influential, forthright, and liberal weekly newspapers in China during the 1980s, a period of relative freedom in the country's modern history. It excelled in publishing editorials and news pushing political and economic reform in China.

== History ==
The Herald was founded in April 1980. For decades, since the founding of the Republic in 1949, the press had been tightly controlled by the Chinese Communist Party (CCP) and used almost exclusively for the purposes of political communication—from the CCP's leaders to the populace. No private publications were allowed to exist.

After the launching of reforms after the Cultural Revolution, however, there was a blossoming of print publication in China. The number of newspapers in China went from 200 nationally in 1976 to 320 in 1979, the year after the beginning of reforms. By the first half of the 1980s, less than half of the newspapers in the country had been established in the last five years. By 1987 there were 2,509 newspapers in China, 255 of which were printed daily.

The Herald, based in Shanghai, became one of the most liberal and outspoken in all of China. It gained this role quickly primarily due to its 'independence,' that is political independence, since its founding. It was self-financed and free from institutional links to the CCP and government.

The paper introduced new ideas about economic reform and development, popularizing economic knowledge related to both domestic and international matters. The Herald was praised for helping to promote China's economic reforms and it was considered "an authority on both world and national economic issues," according to Won Ho Chang, Professor and Director of the Stephenonson Research Center at the University of Missouri's School of Journalism.

In its first two years it focused primarily on matters of international economics, before expanding to coverage of China's economy. By the late 1980s the paper's orientation was that without political reform, economic reform would eventually be ineffectual.

The paper never formally endorsed by the CCP, but it was printed under the sponsorship of the Shanghai Academy of Social Sciences and the World Economic Society. It sometimes thus had to pay more for newsprint and distribution (through the postal system).

The Herald used to be printed on the presses of the Liberation Daily and did not have to submit proofs for scrutiny before going to press.

=== Political impact ===
Like newspapers that have succeeded it in the digital age, such as Caijing and the Nanfang newspapers, the Herald was able to survive in times of political difficulty because its editor-in-chief exercised careful judgement. "Qin Benli was adept at gauging the political climate, lying low when necessary and resurfacing at the appropriate moment."

The political impact of the Herald went beyond mere survivability. According to Lynn White II and Li Cheng, the development of the Herald was closely connected with China's "technocratic movement," which helped popularize notions of "science" and "democracy." Political development in the 1980s put emphasis on those ideas and the Herald played a "critical role" as part of this "elitist movement."

=== Shutdown ===
The newspaper was shut down amidst the political turmoil of the 1989 Tiananmen Square protests and massacre. Jiang Zemin, who was the Party Secretary of Shanghai at the time, is thought to have played a significant role in the action. A "reorganization group" was installed to oversee the paper's closure while the chief-editor Qin Benli was ousted.

The newspaper's editorial board responded with a statement of "Our Attitudes and Demands," on May 1, 1989. They characterized the decisions made by the Shanghai Municipal Committee of the Chinese Communist Party as "conspicuously unjust" which "damaged the image of the party and the state." The editorial board charged that the committee with "disregarded the facts and dealt with the problem in an oversimplified and crude way." The board demanded that the suspension of Comrade Qin Benli be annulled and that the matter should be handled "strictly" according to the law and the "fundamental rights of the news agencies."
