= Liu Zaifu =

Chinese author, poet and academic (1941–2026)

Liu Zaifu 刘再复
- Born: 22 October 1941; Nan'an, Fujian, China
- Died: 24 May 2026 (aged 84)
- Occupations: Writer, poet, academic
- Writing career
- Period: 1977–2026
- Notable works: "Farewell to Revolution" (1997); "Reflections on Dream of the Red Chamber" (2008)

Signature
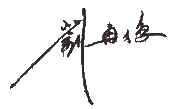

Liu Zaifu (simplified Chinese: 刘再复; traditional Chinese: 劉再复; pinyin: Liú Zàifù; 10 October 1941 – 24 May 2026) was a Chinese author, poet, and academic who was a professor in literature and the liberal arts. Liu is particularly well known for his work "Reflections on Dream of the Red Chamber", which analyzes the Chinese classic "Dream of the Red Chamber", but with Liu's personal viewpoints and philosophy. He lectured at the University of Chicago, University of Colorado, Stockholm University, and the City University of Hong Kong, where he served as an honorary professor in 2004.

== Life and career ==
Liu was born into a peasant family in southern Fujian in 1941. Liu took particular interest in Marxist literature, but put his own morals and messages behind the pieces, rather than those given by the party.

He studied Chinese literature at Xiamen University. After his graduation, he became the editor-in-chief of Wenxue Pinglun (Literary Review), a Chinese periodical discussing literary works. He worked as an editor for Beijing-based magazine, New Construction.

During the Cultural Revolution, Liu was placed under house arrest for his personal views of Marxist belief and doctrine not matching those of the party. He was given protection by future President Hu Jintao.

Towards the end of the Cultural Revolution, Liu traveled abroad, going to Taiwan, Hong Kong, and the United States among other places, which would end up influencing his works, along with spreading his literature abroad outside of China.

In 1979, Liu joined the Communist Party and assisted senior literary leaders and writers with their manuscripts and speeches.

From 1985 to 1989, Liu was the director of the Institute of Literature at the Chinese Academy of Social Sciences. During his tenure, he sponsored academic discussions on cultural liberalization.

Liu died on 24 May 2026, at the age of 84.

== Thought ==
Liu's 1986 monograph On the Composition of Human Character is one of his most acclaimed but also most criticized texts. The text contends that humanist literature should exceed the bounds of Maoist aesthetics and assert the "inner universe". The same year, he applied Li Zehou's philosophy of subjectivity to literary theory and published an article in People's Daily calling for "socialist humanism."

Liu and Li Zehou wrote A Farewell to Revolution in 1995. The book, which criticised Mao-era radicalism and mass uprising as violent and called to "bid farewell to revolution" in favor of incremental reform and the development of democratic temperament, became a major text for those who continued to advocate the New Enlightenment ideals. The book also led to the increasing divergence of perspective between liberal intellectuals and New Left intellectuals over the New Enlightenment legacy, as New Left intellectuals viewed the book as a veiled neoliberal effort to depoliticise radical thinking and legitimate end-of-history liberal triumphalism.

Liu's 2002 work with Lin Gang, Guilt and Literature, discusses two categories of individual responsibility for the excesses of the Cultural Revolution. Guilt and Literature distinguishes between a "limited legal responsibility" for imposing judgment based on a person's individual legal and political consequences and an "infinite moral responsibility" through which individual's actions are ultimately judged by their "inner conscience".

== Works ==
- Lu Xun and Natural Science (Theory) (1977)
- Comments on Heng Meiji and Yang Zhijie (1978)
- Rain Silk Set (1979)
- Lu Xun's Biography (1981)
- On Lu Xun's Aesthetic Thought (1981)
- Farewell (1983)
- Deep Sea Pursuit (1983)
- Sun? Land? Man (1984)
- White Rushes (1985)
- Liu Zaifu's Essay (1986)
- Reflections on Literature (1986)
- Human? Mother-in-law? Love (1988)
- Chinese People and Tradition (1988)
- On the Design of Human Culture in China (1988)
- Liu Zaifu's Prose Poem Collection (1988)
- Liu Zai Collection (1988)
- Human Goddess of Love (2013)
- Laughter for the Search (2013)
- Reading the Bohai Sea Again (2013)
