= Qin Benli =

Chinese journalist (1918–1991)

Qin Benli (Chinese: 钦本立; August 13, 1918 – April 16, 1991) was a well-known Chinese journalist, newspaper editor, commentator, and founder of the World Economic Herald newspaper.

Benli grew up as the eldest of four children (two sisters and one brother). He completed his elementary school studies in Huzhou, Zhejiang Province, and at the age of 18, he enrolled in the prestigious Hangzhou High School. He was ejected from this school because of his political activities. He was expelled again from his next high school for the same reason. Again at Chaoyang University, Qin was expelled for his political activities in his third year of undergraduate studies. The consistent political behavior that booted him from those three schools was his organization of patriotic and pro-democracy protests.

Benli got his start as a newspaperman in 1944, working at a string of newspapers in Chongqing and elsewhere in China, before moving to Shanghai to continue that vocation.

Benli is best known for his founding and editorship of the World Economic Herald based in Shanghai. The publication was closed down during the Tiananmen Square demonstrations of 1989. After the newspaper challenged the Communist Party leadership with its reportage on the protests, Qin, called a "legendary" newspaper editor for his work, was dismissed by Shanghai Communist Party secretary Jiang Zemin, and then put under house arrest.

== Career ==
In 1956, Benli consolidated his position as a newspaperman in Shanghai, working at the Wen Hui Bao. He was purged in the anti-rightist campaign the following year, however, and spent the next two decades away from the newspaper industry.

The Herald was launched as an "unofficial newspaper" in 1980 by Benli, with the backing of high-level party officials who wished to encourage economic and (within limits) political reforms. With a national circulation of 300,000, it quickly became required reading for elites and intellectuals.

On April 3, 1989, the Herald called for more open government, elections, freedom of speech and regulations that officials make public their salaries. These same demands were soon taken up by the students protesting in Tiananmen Square.

== Political leanings ==
Qin Benli, and his newspaper's links to the reformist faction in the Communist Party, in particular Zhao Ziyang, were widely known in political circles at the time. After the Tiananmen massacre, Chen Xitong, the mayor of Beijing, claimed that there was a "conspiracy" between the Herald, the protesting students, and Zhao Ziyang.

The entire publication re-organized and Benli was dismissed from the newspaper on April 26, 1989, amidst student protests in Beijing and Shanghai. The ire of local authorities, specifically Jiang Zemin, had been drawn by the publication of six pages of reminiscences and discussion after the death, on April 15, of Hu Yaobang, the former Communist leader who had been ousted by party hardliners. The previous January, the newspaper, under Qin's guidance, had also published an article by a scholar in Beijing which criticized the party. These events led a team of five censors to set up office inside the newspaper, reviewing all material before it went to press.

In the announcement by the Shanghai municipal government that Qin had been dismissed from the paper, he was charged with "serious violations of discipline."

Qin Benli died of stomach cancer on April 16, 1991, at age 73, only two years after being diagnosed with terminal cancer. The authorities did not publicly announce the death out of concerns that it would trigger a public tribute or mourning, which took place around the death of Hu Yaobang and others. They also accorded him a private ward in one of Shanghai's best hospitals, so as to reduce blowback that they were responsible for his death. Qin was allowed to see his wife in hospital, but not foreigners or groups of friends.
