= Wang Binbin =

Wang Binbin (born 1962) is a professor and vice dean of the School of Literature at Nanjing University. He mainly engages in the research of modern and contemporary Chinese literature, cultural criticism and cultural history. He has published many articles on literary criticism and has made academic criticisms of the works of scholars such as Wang Shuo, Jin Yong and Yu Qiuyu. He also sparked controversy in the academic community by writing an article accusing Tsinghua University professor Wang Hui of plagiarism in many parts of his famous doctoral dissertation "Resisting Despair: Lu Xun and His Literary World".

== Life ==
Wang Binbin was born in Taihu County, Anhui Province. He took the college entrance examination in 1978 and was later admitted to the Chinese People's Liberation Army Luoyang Foreign Languages College (now the Chinese People's Liberation Army Foreign Languages College) and was assigned to the Japanese language major. After graduating from university in July 1982, he worked in the army in Dabie Mountains and Nanjing City. In September 1986, Wang Binbin was admitted to the Department of Chinese Language and Literature of Fudan University to pursue a master's degree in modern and contemporary Chinese literature. In 1989, he was exempted from the entrance examination and entered the doctoral program in the same major in advance. In July 1992, he received a doctorate in literature. Behind the scenes, because of his military status, he returned to the Nanjing Military Region and worked in the Political Department's Art Creation Office. In 1999, Wang Binbin left the army and taught at the Department of Chinese Language and Literature of Nanjing University.

== Works ==
He had published many representative works such as

- Between Utilitarianism and Aestheticism
- Three Famous Literary Figures: Jin Yong, Wang Shuo and Yu Qiuyu
- Set fire in the Night and Waggle wings to water
- The Past Makes Us Lament
- The Back Shadow that Didn't Go Far Away
- Things about Lu Xun
- Lun Xun's Feelings in Later Life

== See also ==
- Wang Hui's plagiarism incident
