= Gu Zhun =

Chinese economist (1915–1974)

Gu Zhun (Chinese: 顾准; 1915–1974) was a Chinese intellectual, economist and pioneer of post-Marxist Chinese liberalism. A victim of "anti-Rightist" purges, he spent his later life in prisons and reeducation centres.

The recovery and publication of Gu's prison diaries and theoretical writings caused a sensation in intellectual circles when published in the mid 1990s. Having spent his life as a highly trained economist with Marxist convictions, disciplines, and heroic career as a revolutionary, his fall from grace and savage punishment led him to develop an authentic and deeply personal conversion to the values of liberal democracy. Cut off from the mainstream of 20th century Western thought, he in a sense "reinvented the wheel" of liberal theory. While certain critics have disparaged his ideas as "laughable if translated into English," from a Chinese liberal perspective he represents a rare case of authentic invention of liberalism, relatively free of suspect foreign influences.

Gu was an accountancy expert in his youth, joining the underground Communist Party in Shanghai in the late 1930s, and later appointed to leading roles in the post-Liberation Shanghai bureau of tax administration. However, having given outspoken and unwelcome advice to senior cadres, he was in 1952 charged with counter-revolutionary tendencies, demoted and sentenced to "remoulding."

In each of the succeeding cycles of Leftist-inspired purges Gu's "Rightist" label was reimposed and his punishments renewed. Rehabilitated in a brief period of political relaxation in the early 1960s, he was rescued from his pariah status by the economist Sun Yefang, with whom he had been associated in the Shanghai underground Communist movement. Sun arranged a research position for Gu in the Institute of Economics of the Philosophy and Social Science Section (Xuebu, 学部) of the Chinese Academy of Sciences (CAS). The Xuebu was to form the core of the Chinese Academy of Social Science (CASS) when it was split off from CAS in 1977. Many senior figures in CASS, such as the economist Wu Jinglian, were formatively influenced by Gu Zhun during this period.

The Cultural Revolution once again submerged people with Rightist backgrounds. Gu was again subjected to harsh punitive treatment, losing contact with his wife and children. His main contact with the outside world was with his brother Chen Minzhi (陈敏之) (1920–?).

Contemporary intellectual historians like Zhu Xueqin have hailed Gu Zhun's oeuvre as a major resource for contemporary Chinese liberalism. Li Shenzhi, a Vice-President of CASS and noted liberal activist, wrote of Gu Zhun as a man who "set himself ablaze to illuminate others." Pro-CCP critics decry this as exaggeration, pointing to the limits of Gu's intellectual range.

== Main economic thought ==
(Most of his works were written in 1973 and 1974.)

- He raised questions that his contemporaries did not dare to, and tried to give some tentative answers. In this process, he gradually moved away from the idealism still active in communist doctrine, and rediscovered Anglo-American empiricism and the liberty intrinsic to it.
- At a time when dogmas of Soviet-fashioned central planning predominated, he was among the world pioneers of the idea that socialism should incorporate market economics. In arguing that socialism aimed at a "good market economy" as distinct from the "bad ones" found in capitalist systems, he emphasised the values of the rule of law and constitutionalism.
- In 1965, Gu Zhun was forced to work in Xinyang, Henan province. During Mao's period, some 200,000 people died of hunger in that region (Xinyang Incident during the Great Chinese Famine period). There were even cases of cannibalism. Shocked by what he saw, Gu began to ask how communist idealism could be the doctrinal source of such horrors, and how such tragedy could be avoided in future. He wrote,

"… today people turn idealism into dogmas in the name of revolution, hence I am turning absolutely to empiricism and pluralism, and democracy."

- In his article "On Commercial Production and the Theory of Value under Socialism" (1957), he insisted that the market, rather than a central Plan, should be the basis of productive decisions. Planning could not be expected to encompass everything, to interfere in detail with processes of production and transfer, let alone to perform with complete precision. At a time in which Karl Marx and Mao Zedong were accredited with quasi-divine wisdom, and their dicta treated as infallible, unquestionable and unalterable, Gu Zhun's new model of planning was nothing short of heresy. At that time, had an ordinary person been reported to have raised such ideas, they would have been put into prison, even executed. These, however, were the views that enlightened later key economists such as Sun Yewang and Wu Jinglian and form the core of the post-Mao reforms

== Why did capitalism arise in Britain? ==
- Britain inherited technologies accumulated from the Renaissance onward, gathered experience in management, navigation developed in the 16th century, trade, and the advantageous consequences of colonization.
- a United Kingdom was founded whose basic policy was to protect the expansion of commercial interests
- The United Kingdom expanded immensely through colonization. However, the goal was not to establish a Roman style empire like Napoleon, but to establish a Greek style colonial order which was relatively independent of the mother country.
- Business adopted the form of monopolistic companies (the East Indian company, the South China Sea company, etc.), consisting mostly of entrepreneurially-minded aristocrats. In the mid 19th century, Mill emphasized in his works that it was not appropriate for the state to manage business directly. These had in fact been standard British government views since the 17th century.
- (China was just the opposite, with monopolies in salt and iron from the Han Dynasty to the Qing Dynasty. Traditionally, all these enterprises were controlled and managed by the central government).
- The effects of different approaches to war. The Napoleonic war, won by England and lost by France, was Gu Zhun's example. France, whose historical heritage was in many ways similar to Britain's, adopted standard dynastic policies. Virtually without exception these led to the suppression of development. In Britain, on the other hand, wars led to the accumulation of wealth, leading ultimately to the industrial revolution.

Imperialism (the "highest level of capitalism," according to Lenin) failed to follow the path predicted by Lenin, just as capitalism had not developed according to the predictions of Karl Marx.

Marx had predicted inevitable demise of capitalism, on the grounds that:

1. The core of capitalism ⇒ multiplication of capital ⇒ high profit ⇒ lower wages ⇒ insufficient consumption ⇒ creates panic;
2. Moreover, when the organic composition of capital increases, the commensurable surplus value performance for the increasingly lowed capital profit margin. Thus, the margin profit on capital tends to zero: capitalism cannot persist in the long run and will die eventually;
3. In social structural terms, capital tends to be centralised. As more and more capitalists are deprived, contradictions between capital and private ownership will increase. Socialism will finally only require a slight effort.
4. These predictions were belied by the realities of the early 20th century, making it necessary for Lenin to offer a modified theory. Unfortunately, this too failed to be confirmed. The Great Depression that followed the economic crisis of 1929 (the third "international" general crisis of the 1930s) encouraged a rediscovery of Marx. Now 40 years had gone by (i.e. to the time of Gu Zhun's writing), but no repeat of the Great Depression has taken place and it was unlikely that it ever would. Why?

The reason for capitalism's great vitality is, apart from new technology, products and materials; and big companies, governments and trade union; and in addition to its pluralistic philosophy, academic freedom and democratic politics, is that it did not limit, but tried to develop critique. Capitalism may be a pile of evil, but this fact is constantly exposed, and given unceasingly attention. Improvements great or small can thus be made. Hence, capitalism was enabled to continue; "…I see that the capitalism cannot be extinguished through violent revolution, because of its improvement through critique . …"

== See also ==
- Chinese philosophy
