= Cheng Xiaonong =

Chinese-American author

- 程晓农
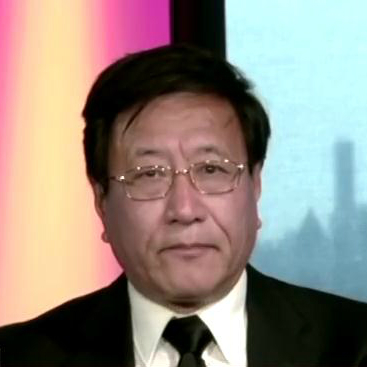
- Cheng Xiaonong

Researcher of the Office of the Standing Committee of the National People's Congress Deputy Director of the Research Institute of China Economic System Reform
- In office 1985–1989

Personal details
- Born: February 19, 1952 (age 74) Shanghai, China
- Citizenship: United States
- Party: Chinese Communist Party (quit in 1989)
- Spouse: He Qinglian
- Education: Renmin University of China; Princeton University
- Profession: Economic, sociology

Cheng Xiaonong (simplified Chinese: 程晓农; traditional Chinese: 程曉農; pinyin: Chéng Xiǎonóng; born 19 February 1952) is a Chinese-American author.

== Biography ==
Cheng was born in Shanghai on February 19, 1952. After middle school, Cheng was sent to Feidong County to work as a farmer.

In 1975, Cheng worked in Anhui Geologic Branch (安徽省地质局). Resumption of University Entrance Examination in 1977, Cheng moved to Beijing, he was a graduate student of Renmin University, and he holds an M.A. in economics from Renmin University in 1985.

After graduation, Cheng served as a researcher of the office of the Standing Committee of the National People's Congress and the Deputy Director of the Research Institute of China Economic System Reform.

In 1989, Cheng became a visiting scholar at University of Göttingen and Princeton University, he earned a doctorate in sociology from Princeton University.

From 1997 to 2009, Cheng served as the chief editor of Modern China Studies (当代中国研究).
