= Xu Youyu =

Chinese activist and scholar

Xu Youyu (simplified Chinese: 徐友渔; traditional Chinese: 徐友漁; pinyin: Xú Yǒuyú; Wade–Giles: Hsü Yu-yü, born 1947 in Chengdu) is a Chinese scholar in philosophy, a public intellectual, and a proponent of Chinese liberalism.

== Biography ==
Xu was a teenage Red Guard at the time of the Cultural Revolution. He was a researcher at the Chinese Academy of Social Sciences at the time of the Tiananmen massacre in 1989, and he tried in vain to persuade students to leave Tiananmen Square before the army suppression, as they refused to believe the soldiers would open fire on peaceful student protesters. Investigated after the protests as a student sympathiser, he refused to admit guilt. His career suffered as he was demoted as director of his research centre and remained so until his retirement, having been denied research funding and unable to supervise postgraduate student projects.

In 2014, Xu was awarded Sweden's Human rights Olof Palme Prize.

== Views and analysis ==
Xu is an expert on Western social theories, including Marxism and the Frankfurt School, and a noted historian of the Cultural Revolution. He is one of the signatories of the Charter 08, a manifesto to promote political reform and democratization in China.

Xu contends that cultural conservatism is a doctrine similar to cultural nationalism.

== Bibliography ==
- Xu Youyu (1999). Xingxing sese de zaofan 形形色色的造反：Hongweibing jingshen suzhi de xingcheng ji yanbian 紅衛兵精神素質的形成及演變 (Rebels of All Stripes: A Study of Red Guard Mentalities). Hong Kong: Chinese University Press.
