= Bao Zunxin =

- 包遵信
- Born: September 1937; Wuhu County, Anhui, Republic of China
- Died: October 28, 2007 (aged 70); Dongfang Hospital Beijing University of Chinese Medicine, Fengtai District, Beijing, China
- Education: Peking University

Bao Zunxin (Chinese: 包遵信; pinyin: Bāo Zūnxìn; September 1937 – 28 October 2007) was a Chinese historian and political dissident who was arrested and jailed by the Chinese government for his role in the 1989 Tiananmen Square protests.

== Biography ==
Born in September 1937 in Wuhu County, Anhui, China, he was a 34th-generation descendant of Bao Zheng. Bao graduated from Peking University in 1964. He was a scholar at the History Institute of the Chinese Academy of Social Sciences. Bao also taught as a professor at Beijing Normal University.

In 1989 Bao spoke out in support of pro-democracy protesters who marched in the Tiananmen Square democracy protests. Bao also signed a petition which declared that China was still ruled by an emperor. The "emperor" which the declaration referred to was the supposedly retired Chinese Communist Party leader Deng Xiaoping.

Bao was arrested after the Tiananmen Square massacre, and was charged with "counterrevolutionary propaganda and incitement." He was sentenced to 5 years in prison for his participation in the pro-democracy movement. He served 3 1/2 years of his sentence before being released in November 1992.

== Death ==
Bao died of a brain hemorrhage at the Dongfang Hospital Beijing University of Chinese Medicine, Fengtai District, Beijing on October 28, 2007. He was 70 years old.
