= Lin Yu-sheng =

Taiwanese philosopher and historian (1934–2022)

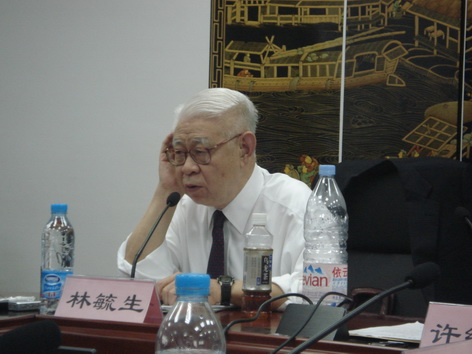
- Born: August 7, 1934; Fengtian, Manchukuo
- Died: November 22, 2022 (aged 88)
- Education: National Taiwan University (BA); University of Chicago (PhD)
- Occupation: Historian

Lin Yu-sheng (Chinese: 林毓生; 7 August 1934 – 22 November 2022) was a Taiwanese philosopher and historian.

== Biography ==
Lin was born in Fengtian, Manchukuo. At the age of seven, he moved to Beijing, and aged 14, settled in Taiwan. In 1958, he earned a bachelor's degree in history from National Taiwan University. He emigrated to the United States in 1960, obtained a doctorate in social thought at the University of Chicago in 1970, and joined the University of Wisconsin–Madison faculty that year, after a period of postdoctoral research at Harvard University. Lin retired from UW–Madison in 2004. Among Lin's influences were Yin Haiguang, Friedrich Hayek, and Edward Shils.

Lin was elected a member of Academia Sinica in 1994. He died in Denver, Colorado, on 22 November 2022 of dementia, aged 88.

== Selected books ==
- Lin, Yu-sheng (1979). Crisis of Chinese Consciousness: Radical Antitraditionalism in the May Fourth Era. University of Wisconsin Press. ISBN 9780299074104.
