= Liberalism in China =

Chinese liberalism
- Traditional Chinese: 中國自由主義
- Simplified Chinese: 中国自由主义
Transcriptions
Standard Mandarin
- Hanyu Pinyin: zhōngguó zìyóu zhǔyì
- Bopomofo: ㄓㄨㄥ ㄍㄨㄛˊ ㄗˋ ㄧㄡˊ ㄓㄨˇ ㄧˋ

Alternative Chinese name
- Traditional Chinese: 中國自由派
- Simplified Chinese: 中国自由派
- Literal meaning: Chinese liberal groups
Transcriptions
Standard Mandarin
- Hanyu Pinyin: zhōngguó zìyóupài
- Bopomofo: ㄓㄨㄥ ㄍㄨㄛˊ ㄗˋ ㄧㄡˊ ㄆㄞˋ

Liberalism (simplified Chinese: 自由主义; traditional Chinese: 自由主義; pinyin: zìyóu zhǔyì) in Greater China is a development from classical liberalism as it was introduced into China during the later years of the Qing dynasty and the Republican period. It focuses more on individualism, rather than communitarianism; a common feature of conservatism in China. Prominent liberals were attacked in the early years of the People's Republic of China but liberal ideas became influential after the end of the Cultural Revolution.

In the People's Republic of China, liberal thought covers a significant range of intellectual currents. Among others, varieties of liberal thought in the PRC include the liberal Marxists of the 1980s and the neoliberals of the 1990s.

== History ==
=== Republic of China ===
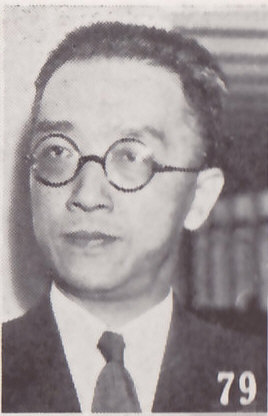
Hu Shih, a leading Chinese liberal writer of the Republic of China

Classical liberalism was introduced into China during the later years of the Qing dynasty and the Republican period.

In the years leading up to the Republic of China in 1912, thinkers such as Yan Fu and Liang Qichao translated works of John Stuart Mill, Herbert Spencer, Immanuel Kant, Jean-Jacques Rousseau and many others. These writers had a cumulative effect, as did the ascendancy of liberalism in world powers like Britain, France and the United States. The establishment of a republic signaled the acceptance (at least in principle) of these models and the liberal values with which they identified, such as constitutionalism and the separation of powers.

The writings of Liang Qichao (1873–1929) played a major role, despite his leanings to a conservative outlook in latter years. The New Culture Movement (1915) and its immediate successor the May Fourth Movement (1919) initially were strongly liberal in character, with key figures like Hu Shih (1891–1962) as the preeminent exponent of liberal values. Other important liberals were Zhang Dongsun (1886–1973) and Zhang Junmai (1887–1969).

Liberalism has been a politically contentious term in China since the 1920s. With the rise of the Chinese Communist Revolution and increasing military pressure from Japan, liberalism underwent a steep decline, and by the 1930s, it was largely overshadowed by the more authoritarian ideals represented by both the Chinese Communist Party (Maoism) and the Kuomintang (Chiangism). Many liberals left China during this period, including rural reformer James Yen and university president Chiang Monlin. Despite this, there were still some prominent scholars espousing the benefits of liberalism, such as Chu Anping, Fei Xiaotong, and Tao Xingzhi.

In 1937, Mao Zedong wrote the essay Combat Liberalism, which characterized disagreement with the CPC leadership as "liberalism".

In 1947, the Constitution of the Republic of China was formally adopted. Under the new constitution, elections were held for the National Assembly and, in the following year, for the Legislative Yuan and the presidency.

=== People's Republic of China ===
In the People's Republic of China, liberal thought covers a significant range of intellectual currents. Among others, varieties of liberal thought in the PRC include the liberal Marxists of the 1980s (who opposed ultra-leftism and supported a reformist socialism) and the neoliberals of the 1990s (who sought market reform and contended that this would necessarily increase political rights).Academic Hang Tu summarizes, "[A] common thread that runs through these heterogenous intellectual dynamics is the call for the condemnation of Mao's revolutionary legacy in particular and the abandonment of radical approaches to Chinese history and politics in general."

According to academic He Li, "Westerners tend to conflate Chinese 'liberals' with dissidents, but the reality is much more complex. Chinese liberals comprise various social actors including scholars, journalists, lawyers, and activists."

Within the PRC context, liberals are often regarded as rightists.

==== Maoist era ====
The ascendancy of Mao Zedong and the establishment of the People's Republic of China in 1949 brought the liberal impulse to its lowest level. Ideological attacks were organized against the followers of Hu Shih, and their values were ceaselessly derided as bourgeois delusions which could only weaken the nation.

During the Mao era, liberalism was viewed as the dominant ideology of the capitalist countries and therefore decadent.

==== Late 1970s-1980s ====
Liberal ideas increased their influence in China after the end of the Cultural Revolution. In the late 1970s, liberalism developed as a loose intellectual faction including proponents of humanist Marxism, critics of the government, and humanist writers. These intellectuals generally sought to emphasize the cosmopolitan aspects of the May Fourth legacy in support of Deng Xiaoping's reforms.

After the end of the Mao-era, ideals like intellectual freedom, the separation of powers, civil society and the rule of law were reexamined in the light of the destruction wrought by the Chinese Communist Party which had been so vociferous in denigrating them. Starting in the Cultural Revolution, many younger people experienced virtual conversions to liberalism. This process was given further impetus by the 1989 Tiananmen Square protests and massacre. The democracy movement espoused (however imperfectly) many liberal doctrines. Among the key figures were Wang Ruoshui (1926–2002), who while remaining a Marxist humanist reconfigured this doctrine along liberal lines, and Liu Xiaobo (1955–2017), initially a literary critic, who broke with Marxism to combine existentialist themes with liberalism. Other influential liberals of the period included Wang Roushui and Yu Guangyuan.

==== Since the 1990s ====
After the 1989 Tiananmen Square protests and massacre, support among intellectuals support for cultural conservatism increased and support for liberal reform and liberal democracy decreased. Support for separation of powers also decreased. Post-crackdown, some liberals increasingly emphasized neoliberalism and the belief that the market was the most effective guarantor of political liberty. Chinese liberalism itself tends to divide into market liberalism, impressed by the US as a political model and adhering to the doctrines of Hayek and other neoliberals, and left-liberalism, more aligned with European social democracy and the welfare state. These tendencies continue to develop in a state of tension.

In the 1990s the liberal wing of the remnant of the pro-democracy movement re-emerged following the 1989 Tiananmen Square protests and massacre, including figures like Qin Hui, Li Shenzhi, Wang Yuanhua, Zhu Xueqin, Xu Youyu, Liu Junning and many others. The writings of Gu Zhun (1915–1974) were rediscovered.

Ranged against the liberals are the populist nationalists and Chinese New Left, which challenged liberal assessments of market reform and emphasized issues including inequality and social justice. From the Chinese leftist perspective, Chinese liberalism places too great of an emphasis on the experiences and memories of China's elitist class and minimizes that of the underprivileged, for whom the socialist state brought improvements in standard of living and cultural dignity. Their intellectual divide intensified especially alongside the social consequences of market-oriented reforms during the 1990s. The restructuring of state-owned enterprises resulted in the large-scale layoffs (xiagang) of millions of urban workers and erosion of the iron rice bowl system of guaranteed employment and welfare.

Li Keqiang was viewed as a reformist in China's ruling elite, advocating for economic liberty. Wang Yang is reformist as a liberal in China's ruling elite, representing a school of thought that advocates for gradual political liberalization.

== In Hong Kong ==
Liberalism in Hong Kong has become the driving force of the democratic movement since the 1980s which is mainly represented by the pro-democracy camp which strives for the universal suffrage, human rights and rule of law in Hong Kong. It is one of two major political ideologies of the Hong Kong, with the other being conservatism.

== Views ==
Some scholars see a liberal tradition in Confucian thought. However, Confucian thought is generally more closely related to the Chinese conservatism.

Taoism and Laozi philosophy are similar to today's liberalism and libertarianism. James A. Dorn wrote that Laozi, like many 18th-century liberals, "argued that minimizing the role of government and letting individuals develop spontaneously would best achieve social and economic harmony."

Chinese liberals typically view themselves as continuing the legacy of the May Fourth Movement and its emphasis on "Mr. Science" and "Mr. Democracy."

Liberals view the Cultural Revolution as a national disaster.

Some Chinese liberals express concerns about the extent to which democracy in China could grant what they view as too much power to rural people whom they deem as backward and "authoritarian" in political leanings.

== Key figures ==
- Carsun Chang
- P. C. Chang
- Chu Anping
- Fei Xiaotong
- Jiang Menglin
- Laozi
- Li Shenzhi
- Liu Junning
- Liu Xiaobo
- Qin Hui
- Sun Fo
- Chou Te-wei
- Tao Xingzhi
- K. C. Wu
- Wang Ruoshui
- Wang Yang
- Wang Yuanhua
- Xu Youyu
- Xu Zhangrun
- Y. C. James Yen
- Zhang Dongsun
- Zhu Xueqin

== See also ==
- Anarchism in China
- China Democracy Party (Taiwan)
- Chinese New Left
- Conservatism in China
- Democracy in China
- Democracy Party of China
- Feminism in China
- Human rights in China
- LGBTQ rights in China
- List of Chinese dissidents
- Pro–Republic of China sentiment
- Reform and opening up
- Secession in China (Self-determination)

== Reference and further reading ==
- Chang, C. (1952). The Third Force in China. New York: Bookman Associates.
- deBary, Wm. T. (1983), The Liberal Tradition in China, New York: Columbia University Press
- Fung, Edmund S. K. (2008). "Were Chinese Liberals Liberal? Reflections on the Understanding of Liberalism in Modern China". Pacific Affairs. 81 (4): 557–576. doi:10.5509/2008814557. JSTOR 40377628.
- Grieder, Jerome B. (1970). Hu Shih and the Chinese Renaissance: Liberalism in the Chinese Revolution, 1917-1937. Cambridge: Harvard University Press. ISBN 0674412508.
- Jenco, Leigh K. (2010), "Chinese liberalism", in Bevir, Mark (ed.), Encyclopedia of Political Theory, London: Sage, pp. 164–166, ISBN 9781412958653. Submitted version at LSE Research Online: https://researchonline.lse.ac.uk/id/eprint/45300/
- Metzger, T. (2005). A Cloud Across the Pacific: Essays on the Clash between Chinese and Western Political Theories Today. Hong Kong: The Chinese University Press.
