= Jasic incident =

Labour dispute in Shenzhen, China

- Part of protest and dissent in China
- Date: 27 July – 24 August 2018
- Location: Shenzhen, Guangdong
- Caused by: Poor working conditions, low wages, and forced overtime at the Jasic Technology factory in Shenzhen
- Goals: Improvement of working conditions, income and overtime work at Jasic Technology; Right to form labor unions; Rehiring of workers fired for participating in labor unions
- Methods: Unionization, demonstrations, direct action, student activism, labor strike, social media activism
- Result: No concessions given; dozens of demonstrators arrested, leftist student groups disbanded by the government

Parties
Jasic Labour Union; Jasic Workers Solidarity Group; Student groups; Beijing Language and Culture University New New Youth Society; Peking University Marxist Society; Renmin University of China New Light Civilians' Development Association; Retired Communist Party cadres; Maoists	Jasic Technology; Yanziling police

Lead figures
Jasic Labour Union: Mi Jiuping; Yu Juncong; Li Zhan; Liu Penghua; Student activists: Yue Xin; Qiu Zhanxuan; Zhang Shengye; Shen Mengyu	

Casualties
- Detained: 50+, including two officials from the All-China Federation of Trade Unions

The Jasic incident (Chinese: 佳士事件; pinyin: Jiāshì shìjiàn) was a labour dispute in Pingshan District, Shenzhen of the Guangdong province of China between labour organizers and Chinese authorities that lasted from July to August 2018.

The dispute began on 27 July 2018 when a group of workers of Jasic Technology Co., Ltd., dissatisfied by low pay, poor working conditions, and long shifts sought to form a trade union. Jasic responded to the workers petition by firing the employees. This sparked weeks of protests by factory workers in Shenzhen, as well as student members of the Jasic Workers Solidarity Group and other sympathizers. The protests consisted of public demonstrations, labour strikes, and direct action, and have been described as being largely Marxist and Maoist in nature.

After a time of protests, on 24 August 2018, the police raided the activists' apartment and arrested about 50 people on the spot. In the months that followed, activists across the country who had been involved in protests were interrogated by the police, and left-wing societies in universities were disbanded or reorganized.

== Background ==
Jasic Technology Co., Ltd. was founded in 2005 and later listed on the Shenzhen Stock Exchange, the company is chiefly involved in the fabrication of various welder and welding products. The company has factories in Shenzhen, Chongqing, Chengdu and other locations, including the Shenzhen plant which employs about 1,000 people. Pan Lei is chief executive officer (CEO) of Jasic, along with CFO Xia Ruyi, and board secretary Rui Li. However, AsiaNews reports that workers complained that working conditions at the factory had deteriorated severely and that wages, as well as social security and housing funds, had been cut, and the company treated them "like slaves".

With the introduction of capitalist reforms by Deng Xiaoping many party hardliners and Maoists have been critical of the reform citing them as being "revisionist" and anti-socialist. After 1989 Tiananmen Square protests and massacre, university students have generally been supportive of the reforms. As economic growth stagnates and income inequality grows within China more students have begun to express interest in far-left politics, particularly that of Marxism and Maoism. Protestors stated they were influenced primarily by May Fourth Movement of 1919 in China.

In mainland China, the All-China Federation of Trade Unions always needs to follow the government, so it is sometimes accused of defending the interests of factory owners. According to labor rights experts, at least since 2015, as government lending has decreased, labor rights have been drastically reduced, leading to dissatisfaction among the working class over excessive work intensity and low wage levels. Despite the introduction of many national-level laws to protect labor rights since 2000, workers' rights in China remain poor for many. The workers' movement as a protest movement has been further suppressed since 2015.

According to China Labour Bulletin, in the 12 months leading up to August 2018 more than 1,860 strikes or worker protests occurred across China. From 2015 to 2017, the organization received a total of 6,694 cases of collective action by workers, of which 5,177 cases were demands for unpaid wages and 303 cases were demands for wage increases, accounting for more than 80% of the total. Moreover, the momentum of workers' collective action was becoming stronger, rapidly spreading from the Pearl River Delta and the Yangtze River Delta to inland areas, with a significant increase in organization. China Labour Bulletin believed that the intensification of labor-capital conflicts in China has surpassed the critical point for politics and people's livelihood, directly threatening the legitimacy of the regime. The New York Times quoted unnamed experts, noting that as China's economy further develops, 5 to 6 million workers could lose their jobs in the coming years, potentially leading to more unrest.

== Details ==
=== Workers' unrest ===
In May 2018, Yu Juncong, a 25-year-old worker born in Jiangxi province, was dismissed. Several workers at the Jasic Technology factory in Shenzhen – citing the dismissal of Yu, poor working conditions, illegal mandatory overtime work, and excessive fines – attempted to form a labour union for the factory. When the workers issued their petition to the All-China Federation of Trade Unions and got swiftly rejected, the workers began to form a union anyway. However, the company took a common anti-union position, and in June the managers of the Jasic company called for an Assembly of Employee Representatives to replace the workers' self-organized union. Leading workers of the union soon became the target of management's slander and defamation, accompanied by threats, insults and job redistribution. On 20 July, the police arrested two workers' leaders, after which more than 20 workers went to the police station to demand the release of the two men, who were, however, similarly arrested later. On 27 July, more than 30 workers and supporters involved in the labour dispute were detained again for "picking quarrels and provoking troubles" while attempting to return to work, including significant members of the labour organization.

=== Formation and engagement of solidarity groups ===
University students began to take notice on 27 July, when police violently arrested nearly 30 workers and sympathizers. One day later, Wu Jingtang, who had been a leader during the Tonghua Iron and Steel Group riot ten years ago, called for joining the struggle: "For an awakening of the working class, for Chairman Mao!" Chinese Maoists and New Leftists, notably editors of Maoflag and Utopia, began to show support for the Jasic workers. According to a post related to the call and a report from Voice of America, about 1,100 people joined solidarity groups formed by the Utopia.

On 29 July, Peking University Foreign Language Institute student Yue Xin and other activists published The Peking University Students on the "7-27 Worker Arrest in Shenzhen": the Letter of Solidarity, roughly thirty students and alumni of Tsinghua University signed The Letter of Solidarity: To Release the Detained Workers and the Masses Immediately, and other solidarity letters appeared on the Internet. They asked the Shenzhen police to release the arrested workers immediately and to explain and apologize for the relevant arrests. The letter of solidarity was deleted in less than three hours, by which time it already had tens of thousands of readings. In addition, the open letter issued by some activists received two thousand likes in support, mainly from mainland universities. On the same day, the Jasic company issued a statement denying that it had mistreated workers or prevented them from forming a union. The statement said the company fired some workers under the law and was in the process of establishing a union. Jasic did not respond to a faxed request for further comment from Reuters. In late July, former workers at the company allegedly took direct action against the Shenzhen plant, breaking into the factory and attempting to disrupt production by sabotage.

On 1 August, Amnesty International issued a statement in which a Chinese researcher, Pan Jiawei said that the authorities should solve the problem of exploitation of labour rights and respect workers' right to unionize, and moreover, barring evidence internationally recognized crimes had been committed, that the workers should be released. On the same morning, in Hong Kong, a total of about 30 members of the CTU, the HKCSS and the Street Labour Group marched from Western District police station to the Hong Kong Liaison Office, chanting slogans in solidarity with the Jasic workers. The CTU said it would plea for complaints from the international community in support of the protest and the establishment of independent unions. As the Central Liaison Office refused the protest letters, the demonstrators posted them and other slogans on the front door.

On Monday, 6 August 2018, a reported 80 supporters took part in a demonstration in front of the Yanziling police station. Among them were forty registered members of the Chinese Communist Party and retirees. The rally was largely organized through the popular leftist and Maoist online forum website Utopia. The protesters carried banners that read "Old Jiangxi old workers and old cadres support the workers and their supporters." Zhang Qinde, a retiree from the CCP's Central Policy Research Office and a Maoist intellectual, gave an unrehearsed speech, saying that "We must stand with the working classes and advance and retreat with the Jasic workers. We must see this struggle through till the end!"

On 11 August, Shen Mengyu, a graduate student from Sun Yat-sen University, was bundled into a car by three unidentified men and temporarily went missing, before being confirmed to be held unofficially. Students around Shen reported the abduction to the police, who doubted their story and told them that the video cameras in the area where the incident occurred were broken. Activists accused of the authorities' abduction, with the government insisting it was "a matter regarding a family dispute."

On 19 August, Peking University Yue Xin published an open letter to paramount leader and General Secretary of the Chinese Communist Party Xi Jinping reading,

On behalf of all members of the Solidarity Regiment, I said to the Party Central Committee and General Secretary Xi Jinping that all members of the Solidarity and I will strengthen political consciousness, strengthen the beliefs of Marxism–Leninism and Mao Zedong Thought, and firmly stand on the position of the great working class. We will resolutely safeguard China's socialist and people's democratic dictatorship. We will continue to fight until all the arrested workers are acquitted before the local evil forces are not investigated, and before the basic rights and legal status of the workers are guaranteed!

Neither Xi Jinping or any representative replied or acknowledged the letter.

=== Mass arrest ===
On the morning of 24 August 2018, police raided an apartment that served as a location for workers and students to organize, detaining about 50 people, who were singing L'Internationale at the time of being arrested. In the days that followed, the police went on raids throughout the country, arresting a number of students and workers. The New York Times reports that twelve student activists were missing according to family and relatives. According to relatives, the activists were abducted from Beijing, Guangzhou, Shanghai, Shenzhen and Wuhan. According to some witnesses the activists were beaten.

On 9 September 2018, ten workers and students went to Shaoshan and paid homage to Mao Zedong. They pulled up a banner at the bronze statue square and laid flowers for the bronze statue of Mao Zedong, singing L'Internationale before being arrested by local police.

Throughout November, a dozen activists were detained, including two officials from the All-China Federation of Trade Unions who, according to workers, had helped them form a union. On 26 December, Qiu Zhanxuan was taken away by police before he went to attend the 125th anniversary of Mao's birth in Beijing. The following day, the Peking University Marxist Society was forcibly "restructured", and Qiu, as president, said that none of the new staffs from the restructured Society were previous members of the group. Similar to the case of Peking University, Beijing Language and Culture University, Nanjing University and Renmin University of China also began to reorganize or close down their left-wing students associations. Students launched months-long demonstrations, which came to be known as the "Defensive War" for the student associations.

In January 2019, police summoned several activists and showed them an allegedly forced confession video in which four activists (including Yue and Qiu) claimed to renounce labor radicalism. Some activists later wrote blog posts criticizing the police's action, saying it was a "ridiculous performance put on by the police". Seven more people were taken away again.

Several organizers and student activists remained missing, including Yue Xin and Zhang Shengye. In August 2023, Photon Media wrote that Yue Xin has been released and is working and volunteering in a library-related NGO in her spare time.

== Reactions ==
=== Chinese government ===
On 24 August 2018, China's official news agency Xinhua News Agency posted a report entitled "Behind the 'rights protection' of workers at Shenzhen Jasic Technology Co., Ltd." in Chinese, and "Investigation on so-called worker incidents in Shenzhen" in English, arguing the incident was instigated by foreign NGOs, especially an organization called "center for migrant workers". According to Xinhua, Yu and other people clashed with the police at the behest of Fu, an employee of the "center for migrant workers". According to the Chinese version, the "center for migrant workers" is funded by the Hong Kong-registered organization "Worker Empowerment".

=== Others ===
International human rights organizations, including Amnesty International and Human Rights Watch have condemned the Chinese government's response to the Jasic protesters and has called for the release of all detainees involved in the demonstrations.

On 26 August, Ming Pao published an article quoting an unnamed member of the solidarity groups as saying that the groups had initially hoped that registered NGOs would join it, but those organizations were afraid of provoking the local government. The interviewed member of the solidarity groups also accused Xinhua of "fabricating stories" and using "foreign forces" to cover up the facts.

On 27 August, Worker Empowerment issued a statement saying that it "has not been involved in organizing or financing Jasic workers or their sympathizers", while at the same time stating that another organization, the center for migrant workers, "has been actively seeking to register with the Civil Affairs Bureau, and has gone to the relevant government departments to communicate with them about its application and has also gone to the local public security authorities to explain its filing".

The Jasic Workers and Jasic solidarity groups received internal support from Chinese figures such as Chinese labour activist Li Qiang and Professor Pun Ngai of the Sociology Department of The University of Hong Kong, both of whom signed a petition calling for the release of the detained workers and students and an improvement in Chinese labor rights. Furthermore, according to The Guardian, the movement had gained a following within the Chinese political elite, particularly among retired party officials who opposed the economic policy of CCP general secretary Xi Jinping.

The Jasic workers' cause resonated particularly among leftists in the West, who sympathise with the workers' demands for better rights. Popular Marxist philosopher Slavoj Zizek condemned the Chinese government, in an article published in The Independent, stating that the Chinese suppression of these workers and students was proof of the ideological hypocrisy of The People's Republic of China and the governing Chinese Communist Party. At least thirty academics, including linguist and political activist Noam Chomsky and Yale University Political Philosophy professor John Roemer are boycotting Chinese Marxist academic conferences, citing that participation in the Chinese academic community following these suppression would be an act of complicity. Chomsky in statements released through The Financial Times stated that all leftists should join the boycott.

Jacobin columnists Elaine Hui of Pennsylvania State University and Eli Friedman condemned the suppression of the Jasic workers union and the student protesters.

== See also ==
- New Left in China
- Maoist Communist Party of China
- China Labor Watch
- 996 working hour system
- Reform and opening up
