= Delivery Knights Alliance =

Chinese food delivery organization

The Delivery Knights Alliance (also known as Knights League, Chinese: 外送江湖骑士联盟 or 外卖江湖骑士联盟; lit. 'Alliance of Food Delivery Riders Among Rivers and Lakes') is a food delivery organization and informal labor union in China.

== History ==
The prototype of the Alliance could trace back to 2018, as the leader of the Alliance, Chen Guojiang (Chinese: 陈国江, also known as Mengzhu, Chinese: 盟主; lit. 'master of the Alliance', or another name Chen Tianhe, Chinese: 陈天河), a food deliver, joined some deliver groups on WeChat and gradually became the leader. The organization was formally established in June 2019, when Chen urged the people in these groups to attach cards to their delivery boxes to make more people get in touch with him and joined the groups. Chen helped the delivers who joined his groups deal with difficulties, including staged crashes and negotiations with police.

Several days before the 2019 Singles' Day in China, the delivery platforms uniformly lower the unit price of rider delivery, Chen mobilized everyone in his groups to make a work stoppage and was later arrested for 26 days.

In February 2021, Chen and some other delivers complained that Ele.me and delivery platforms launched to reward riders to stay in Beijing during the Chinese New Year activities are suspected of deception. On February 19, Ele.me's official Sina Weibo account apologized and promised to increase compensation activities. In March, Chen was detained. By his detention, about 14,000 delivers had joined his Wechat groups, some of them tried to organize a wildcat general strike, which was suppressed by the authority. Later in April, he was accused of "picking quarrels and provoking troubles". His friends raised about 1.2 million CNY (around 20 thousand US dollars) to pay the attorneys' fees, who were later warned by the police to give in.

Chen reappeared in January 2022.

== Activism ==
Chen opened a series of social media accounts to publish short videos related to delivers, including Douyin, Kuaishou, Sina Weibo, and Bilibili. He also offered two-day free housing for people who did not find a rent house and organized parties for delivers.

== Reception ==
After Chen was detained, labor activist groups, human rights groups, and leftist websites expressed concerns over the affair. Labor Notes, China Labour Bulletin, International Socialist Alternative, and Red Song Society had criticized the All-China Federation of Trade Unions and the prohibition of labor unionism. Human rights group Chinese Human Rights Defenders and Trotskyist association International Socialist Alternative urged the authority to release Chen.

An article from The Christian Science Monitor compared the April visit of government official Wang Lin to the delivery industry with the event and criticized labor relations in China.

The US Department of State's China 2021 Human Rights Report mentioned Chen.

== See also ==
- Jasic incident
- Chinese New Left
