= Yue Xin (activist) =

Chinese student activist

- 岳昕
- Born: 1995 or 1996 (age 29–30); Beijing, China
- Education: Peking University (BA)
- Occupations: Student, activist
- Organization: Jasic Workers Solidarity Group

Yue Xin (Chinese: 岳昕; born c. 1996) is a Chinese student activist and graduate from Peking University who participated in the Jasic labour dispute. A Marxist and feminist, she was known for her advocacy of labour and women's rights prior to her disappearance.

In April 2018, Yue led #MeToo-inspired protests against Peking University's attempted cover up of sexual assault allegations made against their staff. Later that year, she joined striking workers at the Jasic Technology plant in Shenzhen and became a leading member of the Jasic Workers Solidarity Group. Yue disappeared shortly afterwards on 23 August 2018, and in January 2019, the Guangdong police circulated a video of her confessing to various crimes and denouncing her own activism. In August 2023, Photon Media wrote that Yue Xin has been released and is working and volunteering in a library-related NGO in her spare time.

BBC News described Yue as one of China's most influential left-wing activists of 2018.

== Early life ==
Yue Xin was born and raised in the city of Beijing and graduated from High School Affiliated to Renmin University of China in 2014. She then enrolled in Peking University's School of Foreign Languages and graduated in 2018.

In an interview with Yazhou Zhoukan, Yue discussed much of her personal life, noting that she became interested in politics in middle school after reading Liu Yu's Details of Democracy. She described herself as a liberal during this period in her life, and upon reaching high school she became increasingly more interested in the living standards of workers and peasants. Yue also attributed her decision to become an activist to her witnessing of the 2013 Southern Weekly incident.

Yue credits Chinese feminist activists Liu Yu and Xiao Meili as her primary influences.

== Activism ==
Yue was a student at Peking University, in the School of Foreign Languages class of 2014. During her senior year she participated in a series of protests against the university's handling of sexual assault allegations and failure to address predatory behaviour within the faculty and staff. The controversy centered around the university's culpability in the death of Gao Yan, a Peking University Chinese literature student who committed suicide in 1998, who was allegedly raped by Shen Yang, then a professor at Peking University.

Yue issued a formal freedom of information request to the university on 9 April 2018, requesting information pertaining to Gao Yan's death and the allegations against Shen Yang. According to Yue, in an open letter to all students and staff of Peking University, the campus staff took immediate actions to attempt to coerce Yue to retract her freedom of information request. She alleges that on 20 April 2018 a school advisor came unannounced to her dorm room with Yue's mother, who had been presented a distorted form of the events in order to persuade her daughter to rescind her request. According to Yue, Peking University failed to provide any relevant materials regarding the allegations against Shen Yang after claiming that the materials were either missing or out of their domain.

== Jasic labour dispute ==
On 8 August 2018, Yue joined the student labour activist organization Jasic Workers Solidarity Group in the protests in Huizhou, Guangdong at the Jasic Technology plant in Shenzhen. Workers at the plant were in a labour dispute with the plant's management, and subsequently the workers, citing poor labour conditions and low pay, attempted to form a labour union in violation of Chinese prohibition of non-state unions. The province of Guangdong is noteworthy for being the principal example of the Guangdong model, the economic policy initiated by Chinese politician Wang Yang. This policy focused on economic liberalization, while ignoring issues with industry practices and social welfare. The dispute led to numerous student activists, Yue among them, travelling to Huizhou to participate in protests against Jasic and the Chinese government's policies on labour rights.

== Disappearance ==
Yue was among fifty members and supporters of the Jasic Workers Solidarity group who were arrested by Chinese police on 23 August 2018. Yue has not been seen in public since her arrest by Guangdong police.

On 21 January 2019, the Jasic Workers Solidarity Group stated on their website that Yue and four other of its members had been forced by Guangdong police to record confessions admitting to "conducting illegal acts" and "being brainwashed by radical organizations". The National Security Department of the People's Republic of China then interviewed other members of the Jasic Workers Solidarity Group and asked them to watch the confession videos.

=== Reactions to Yue's detainment ===
Slovenian philosopher Slavoj Žižek discussed the disappearance of Yue in an article published by The Independent. Žižek points out the inherent contradiction within Chinese society, wherein the official state ideology of Marxism is considered a dangerous form of political subversion.

At least thirty academics, including linguist and political activist Noam Chomsky and Yale University Political Philosophy professor John Roemer announced their intention to boycott Chinese Marxist academic conferences, in reaction to the suppression of university activists who participated in the Jasic labour dispute. Chomsky wrote in a message to the Financial Times: "To continue to participate in ... officially sponsored Marxism-related events means we would stay complicit in the Chinese government's game. Leftist scholars around the world should join the boycott of such conferences and events."

Scholar Letian Lei wrote that the Yue Xin-led 2010s left-wing student activism and the persecutions it suffered demonstrate, on the one hand, the possibility of an authentic Chinese New Left, and one the other hand, its frangibility under the party-state dictatorship.

=== Follow-up ===
In August 2023, Photon Media wrote that Yue Xin has been released and is working and volunteering in a library-related NGO in her spare time.

== Related event ==
On 26 December 2018, the birthday of PRC founder Mao Zedong, Peking University student and head of the Peking University Marxist Society, Qiu Zhanxuan, was arrested by Chinese police.

== See also ==
- Chinese Left-wing Youth
