= Zhang Wenmu =

Chinese geopolitician and strategist

Zhang Wenmu (Chinese: 张文木) is a Chinese geopolitician and strategist. Zhang is currently a professor at the Center for Strategic Studies at Beijing University of Aeronautics and Astronautics, an executive director of the World Socialism Research Center of the Chinese Academy of Social Sciences, and a director of the China Pacific Society. He is a columnist for Chinese nationalist websites such as Utopia, Red Song Society and Guancha.cn. Zhang has a nationalistic political orientation. He is known as China's "hawkish scholar" because he believes that China should continue Mao's ideas in its strategy. Because of his views on maritime power, The National Interest called him one of China's first "navalists". Zhang is regarded as China's leading advocates of the theories of the American strategist Alfred Thayer Mahan.

== Monographs ==
- Zhang, W. (2000). 中国新世纪安全战略 [China's Security Strategy for the New Century] (in Chinese). Jinan: Shandong Renmin Chubanshe. ISBN 9787209026475.
- Zhang, W. (2004). 世界地缘政治中的中国国家安全利益分析 [Analysis of China's National Security Interests in World Geopolitics] (in Chinese). Jinan: Shandong Renmin Chubanshe. ISBN 9787209034579.
- Zhang, W. (2005). 印度国家发展及其潜力评估——与中国比较 [An Assessment of India's National Development and Its Potential: A Comparison with China] (in Chinese). Beijing: Kexue Jishu Wenxian Chubanshe. ISBN 9787502350444.
- Zhang, W. (2008). 全球视野中的中国国家安全战略 上卷 [China's National Security Strategy in a Global Perspective Volume 1] (in Chinese). Jinan: Shandong Renmin Chubanshe. ISBN 9787209044042.
- On China's Maritime Power (2009)
- Zhang, W. (2010). 全球视野中的中国国家安全战略 中卷 [China's National Security Strategy in a Global Perspective Volume 2] (in Chinese). Jinan: Shandong Renmin Chubanshe. ISBN 9787209053808.
- National Strategic Capabilities and the Great Power Game (2012)
- India and the Indian Ocean: A Chinese Geopolitical Perspective (2015)
- Chinese Geopolitical Theories (2015)
- The Impact of the Rise of Christianity and Buddhism on the Competitiveness of the Eurasian Region (2015)
- Revisiting Maoist Strategic Thought (2016)
- Climate Change and the Fate of China (2017)
- Zhang, W. (2018). 战略学札记 [Strategic Studies] (in Chinese). Haiyang Chubanshe. ISBN 9787502799755.
