= Red Song Society =

Maoist website in China

- Website type: Political website
- Available in: Mandarin Chinese
- Founded: 2011
- Area served: People's Republic of China, Worldwide
- Website: Official website
- Current status: Active

The Red Song Society (simplified Chinese: 红歌会网; traditional Chinese: 紅歌會網; lit. 'Red Song Society Website') is a Chinese website promoting Maoism in mainland China, sponsored by Shenzhen Red Song Society Culture Consulting Co., Ltd. The website's motto is "sing red songs; promote righteous ways".

== History ==
Created in May 2011, the website was formerly known as the Shenzhen Red Song Society Forum. After the Bo Xilai incident in 2012, the website was shut down, along with the Utopia and Maoflag, but later restarted.

In 2017, a member of the website and Hong Zhenquai, a Chinese writer for the magazine Yanhuang Chunqiu, went tried in the People's Court of Bao'an District, Shenzhen City for questioning the authenticity of the Five Heroes of Mountain Langya. Hong lost in the first trial and subsequently filed an appeal. In 2018, the Shenzhen Intermediate People's Court in Guangdong province issued a review verdict that the Red Song Society website did not constitute an infringement of Hong Zhenquai's reputation rights. However, according to Guo and Garrick, the case is still under review.

In 2019, the site participated in online criticism of the website Visual China, over claims that it had criticized Mao Zedong by putting the word "dictator" in the caption of some of its photos. Visual China was fined for its conduct.

In July 2022, Hubei Daily Media Group announced that it had sued the Red Song Society for reprinting an article without permission.

== Analysis ==
The Red Song Society has been described as a Maoist left-wing or far-left website. Jude Blanchet, who majored in China's neo-Maoism, describes the website as the neo-Maoist version of Drudge Report. An article from the Economist says posts on the Red Song Society argue that life was fairer in the Mao era, because the state then provided free housing, free education and free medical care for urban workers at the time.
