= Chinese New Left =

Chinese political philosophies

- Simplified Chinese: 中国新左派
- Traditional Chinese: 中國新左派
Transcriptions
Standard Mandarin
- Hanyu Pinyin: Zhōngguó xīn zuǒpài
- Bopomofo: ㄓㄨㄥ ㄍㄨㄛˊ ㄒㄧㄣ ㄗㄨㄛˇ ㄆㄞˋ
- Wade–Giles: Chung^{1}-kuo^{2} hsin^{1} tso^{3}-pʻai^{4}

Alternative Chinese name
- Simplified Chinese: 中国新左翼
- Traditional Chinese: 中國新左翼
Transcriptions
Standard Mandarin
- Hanyu Pinyin: Zhōngguó xīn zuǒyì
- Bopomofo: ㄓㄨㄥ ㄍㄨㄛˊ ㄒㄧㄣ ㄗㄨㄛˇ ㄧˋ
- Wade–Giles: Chung^{1}-kuo^{2} hsin^{1} tso^{3}-i^{4}

The Chinese New Left is a term used in the People's Republic of China to describe a diverse range of left-wing political philosophies that emerged in the 1990s that are critical of the reform and opening up instituted under Deng Xiaoping, which emphasized policies of market liberalization and privatization to promote economic growth and modernization.

Chinese intellectual Wang Hui links the emergence of New Leftism with the 1997 Asian financial crisis and the 1999 United States bombing of the Chinese embassy in Belgrade, which damaged the credibility of liberalism in China, as well as the 1989 Tiananmen Square protests and massacre. Some of the Chinese New Left intellectuals enjoyed prominence, especially with the rise of Chongqing Communist Party secretary Bo Xilai, who promoted a set of socio-economic policies collectively termed the Chongqing model, though they suffered a blow after the end of Bo's career in 2012 due to the Wang Lijun incident.

There is an ambiguity of the term New Left in discourse drawing from the diversity of the movement. Generally speaking, the New Left can be applied to a person who embraces leftist theories, ideals, and traditions rooted in variations of socialist ideology, and other schools criticizing postmodernism and neoliberalism.

The New Left's relationship with Maoism and capitalism is complicated. Although some schools of thought suggest that the New Left wants the return to mass political movements of the CCP Chairman Mao Zedong era and an abandonment of capitalism, others believe that it combines capitalism's open markets with socialist elements (particularly in rural China). Additionally, the views within the New Left are diverse, ranging from hardline Maoists to more moderate social democrats.

== Terminology ==
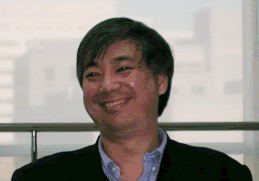
Cui Zhiyuan is the first person to be called China's "New Left".

The term was first used by Chinese journalist Yang Ping, who published a review in the 21 July 1994 issue of Beijing Youth Daily about intellectual Cui Zhiyuan's article "New Evolution, Analytical Marxism, Critical Law, and China's Reality", remarking that China had produced its own "New Left wing". Initially, the term was propagated by liberal opponents who contended that there was no fundamental difference between hardline Maoists and the New Left.

Although many New Left intellectuals oppose certain Maoist approaches, the term "New Left" implies some agreement with Maoism. Since it is associated with the ultra-leftism of the Cultural Revolution, many scholars and intellectuals supporting socialist approaches and reforms, but opposing the radical and brutal approaches of the Maoist period, do not completely accept the "New Left" label. Some are concerned about the fact that adopting leftism implies that China, historically different from the West, is still using a Western model to strategise its reforms and would be limited by how the West defines the Left. Intellectual Wang Hui explains the origin of, and his skepticism about, the term:

The first stirring of a more critical view of official marketization goes back to 1993 ... But it wasn't until 1997–98 that the label New Left became widely used, to indicate positions outside the consensus. Liberals adopted the term, relying on the negative identification of the 'Left' with late Maoism, to imply that these must be a throw-back to the Cultural Revolution. Up until then, they had more frequently attacked anyone who criticised the rush to marketization as a "conservative" - this is how Cui Zhiyuan was initially described, for example. From 1997 onwards, this altered. The standard accusatory term became "New Left" ... Actually, people like myself have always been reluctant to accept this label, pinned on us by our adversaries. Partly, this is because we have no wish to be associated with the Cultural Revolution, or for that matter, with what might be called the "Old Left" of the reform-era CCP. But it is also because the term New Left is a Western one, with a very distinct set of connotations – generational and political – in Europe and America. Our historical context is Chinese, not Western, and it is doubtful whether a category imported so explicitly from the West could be helpful in today's China.

However, liberal intellectual Xu Youyu points out that Wang Hui's performance in his interview with the New Left Review suggests that he fully understood that the term was inevitably generated by social change and intellectual antagonism in China. The term "New Left" remains fraught with confusion due to the lack of clarity in its definition. Some intellectuals labeled as New Leftists, including but not limited to Gan Yang, are associated with Western conservatives, including Leo Strauss, rather than the New Left movement of the 1960s.

== Origin ==
The concept of the New Left arose in China during the 1990s. According to New Left theory, market-economy challenges stem from the fact that under the reform and opening up, the market economy has become the dominant economic system; China's socialist economic reforms have brought the country into the global capitalist sphere. The 1990s New Left intellectuals criticized market reforms for increasing inequality.

The development of the New Left is correlated to increased Chinese nationalism after its period of low-profile presence on the world stage during the Deng Xiaoping era. It is seen as a response to problems faced by China during its modernization drive since the 1980s, which has led to growing social inequality between the coast and hinterlands, and rich and poor. Some scholars believe that, based on its unique and drastic 20th-century economic and political changes, China cannot adopt the social-democratic, capitalist model of many Western countries.

After its initial development as a narrower critique in the 1990s, the New Left drew supporters of statist, populist, nationalist, or Maoist ideas.

The Chinese New Left is concerned with the country's social-inequality issues. Some scholars believe that although the movement is not yet mature, it is likely to embed itself in Chinese society over the next century (assuming that polarization continues). Strikes, sit-ins, slow-downs, and peasant uprisings, sporadic due to government suppression, are on the rise and may become more organized with the development of the New Left.

Although they are skeptical and critical of capitalism, New Leftists recognize its influence on China and discuss the strengths and weaknesses of capitalist models. Cui Zhiyuan, a leading New Left intellectual, believes that it is imperative that socialism and capitalism are not viewed as opposites. According to Zhang Xudong, "An advocate for New Deal-style economic and social policies in China was considered to be liberal in the 1980s, but as 'New Left' by the century's end." This overlap suggests that ideals set forth by the New Left strongly resemble the democratic socialism of the 1980s.

== Intellectual views ==
=== Economics ===
The Chinese New Left supports a strong state and the governmental provision of public goods like health care and education.

Economics plays a significant role in the Chinese New Left, whose development is closely associated with the reform and opening up. Many supporters of the New Left generally believe that a leftist economic model should be found to tackle China's dependence on exports and savings, reduce the growing economic gap between rural and urban areas, and stimulate private business through public ownership and state planning. The capitalist free-market model applied in most social-democratic programs is undesirable because, instead of challenging and reforming the existing market economy and representative democracy, it seeks to moderate the social consequences of structural division and hierarchy. A suitable, sustainable market model is vital for China's leftist movement. At the same time, the New Left criticized market reforms by citing the damage they caused to the countryside as an argument. Like China's Old Left, the New Left supports state socialism as the alternative to neoliberal capitalism.

The Chinese New Left is skeptical of economic globalisation, contending that it facilitates capitalist colonization by Western multi-national companies.

New Left economist Cui Zhiyuan believes that a labour-capital partnership, based on the ideas of James Meade and John Maynard Keynes, can be used to introduce some flexibility to the labour market. Outside shareholders own capital-share certificates; workers own labour and share certificates, which replace a fixed wage and reduce the conflict of interest between workers and capitalists. Any decision that will improve one group (by raising the dividend on its share) will automatically raise the dividend on the shares of the other group. Many New Left intellectuals are confident in the outcome of collective economic-development planning, anticipating rural industrialization.

Some in the Chinese New Left use critical theory, such as postmodernism or postcolonialism, to critique China's market-oriented reforms. Other schools of thought that have contributed to the perspectives of the New Left include neo-Marxism, dependency theory, and world-systems theory.

=== Opposition to Western models ===
The New Left rejects the idea of Western-style democracy, contending that competitive elections are either harmful or irrelevant to true democracy. In the New Left view, liberal democracy is an undesirable departure from the democratic concept of direct self-rule by the people. New Leftists also cite falling election turnouts and loss of confidence in election results as further weaknesses of the Western system. They contend that the Western model of democracy results in endless political debate, inaction, and stalemate.

The general belief on the New Left is that China's historical conditions, including its experiences with drastic economic and political changes over the course of the 20th Century, means that it cannot adopt Western democracy. New Left intellectuals criticized Francis Fukuyama's End of History theory.

The New Left rejects the Western construct of universal values, deeming them as in fact historically contingent and expressions of Western self-interest. The New Left contends that Western calls for "human rights" and "democracy" in China are in fact part of a geopolitical strategy to weaken China. Some in the New Left describe Western-style democracy as a "trap" for China in which only China's new rich would benefit and the interests of most people in China would be harmed.

New Leftists are often skeptical of constitutionalism, deeming that its critical elements and theories exist for the benefit of capital and not the people.

=== Other contemporary critique ===
A frequent New Left critique of contemporary policy is that the government has not taken a strong enough position in territorial disputes, particularly those with Japan and the Philippines, and that the government should be doing more to assert itself as a "great power" to ensure a "just world."

The New Left criticizes the neo-authoritarian school of thought, contending that it deviates from socialist principles.

=== Historical analysis ===
As part of the New Left's contention that socialism is the best political model, the New Left often points to the success of the socialist countries in improving basic needs (nutrition, health care, housing, and education), especially given those countries' historical level of development.

In assessing Mao's legacy, the New Left praises him for contributions in building a new China through its political, agricultural, and industrial revolutions. It deems his legacy fundamentally positive with some failings and setbacks. Among the aspects of the Mao era that that the New Left believes should be rehabilitated are certain aspects of the Cultural Revolution. For example, the New Left views the Cultural Revolution as a period of economic equality and an attempt to achieve "genuine popular sovereignty". It is assessed as a period of creative destruction that allowed ordinary people to increase their power in China. New Leftists favor the Cultural Revolution concept of Big Democracy, and its "four great freedoms" of speaking out freely, airing views fully, writing big-character posters, and engaging in big debates.

Other aspects of the Mao era praised by New Leftists include advances in literacy, public education, mass vaccination, and health care for children. New Leftists generally contend that the increases in China's development and Reform and Opening Up would not have been possible without the groundwork laid during the Mao era.

The New Left favorably regards Mao's assessment of foreign threats, and national emphasis on self-reliance in case China had to fight the Soviet Union or the United States. The New Left also credits Mao for working towards rapprochement with the United States and thereby leaving a solid footing for Deng era foreign policy.

== Social movements ==
The basic positions of the New Left support for the economically marginalized and opposition to capitalism and Western-style democracy. Differing from the Old Left, the New Left frames its positions in social justice and participatory politics as opposed to ideas of class struggle or the dictatorship of the proletariat.

New Left perspectives have significant appeal among peasants, migrant workers, the urban poor, and students. The popularity of New Left positions with these groups have further increased during the Xi Jinping era. New Left views have also resonated with some former officials from the Mao era.

Many New Leftists have studied in the United States and were disenchanted by the experience.

According to the Financial Times in 2016, several experts estimate that if there were free elections in China, a neo-Maoist candidate would win. This Maoist revival movement precedes the tenure of CCP General Secretary Xi Jinping, whose own revival of Mao-era elements seem to be intended as a conciliatory move towards the neo-Maoists. It is believed that the rising popularity of neo-Maoism is due to the growing economic dislocation and inequality under market reforms and globalisation.

Critiques of CCP General Secretary Jiang Zemin's 2001 decision to allow private business people to become party members, referring to the decision as "political misconduct" and "ideological confusions", helped fuel the rise of what would become known as the New Left movement.

Neo-Maoists first became prominent under CCP General Secretary Hu Jintao's administration, delivering far-left attacks on CCP policy from websites such as Utopia, or MaoFlag. They expanded into a political movement through association with the Chongqing Party Secretary Bo Xilai, and succeeded in surviving crackdowns. It is believed that the CCP leadership is reluctant to eradicate these groups due to their connection with CCP history and ideology.

Maoism and neo-Maoism have been increasingly popular after the rise of Xi Jinping among millennials and poor Chinese people, and they are more frequently covered by foreign media.

=== Nanjie Village and land reform ===
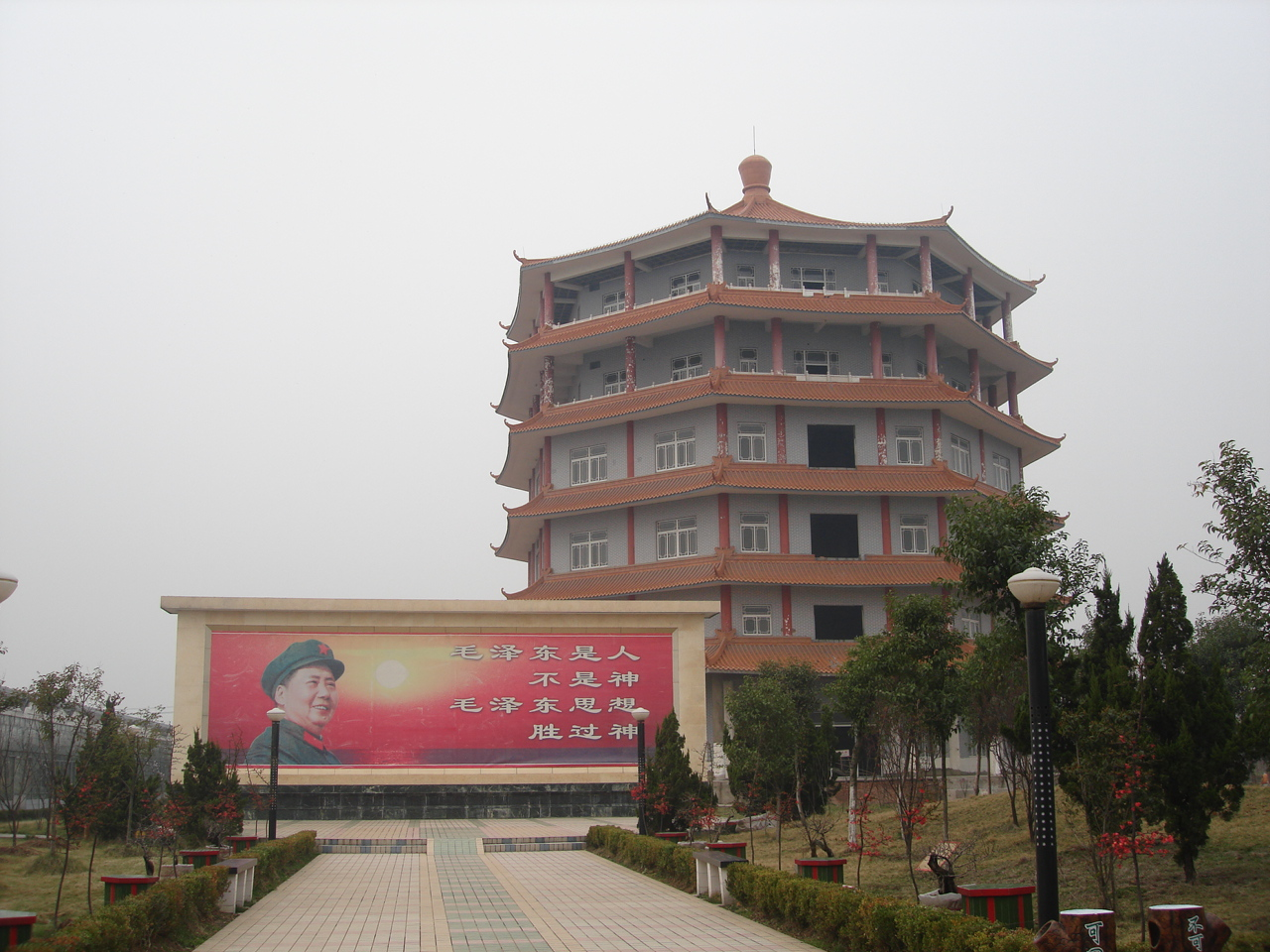
A building and a wall in Nanjie, Henan, on which is written "Mao Zedong was a man, not a god, but the Mao Zedong Thought is better than the gods". (毛泽东是人不是神，毛泽东思想胜过神)

National Public Radio's website posted a story about the village of Nanjie in Henan on 13 May 2011, calling it a prime example of recent "re-collectivizations" inspired by Mao's ideas: "The furniture and appliances in each home are identical, including the big red clocks with Chairman Mao's head, radiating psychedelic colours to the tune "The East Is Red." [Villager] Huang Zunxian owns virtually nothing in his apartment. The possessions are owned by the collective, right down to the couch cushions .... " Some villages around the country have followed Nanjie's example and re-collectivized."

During the 1990s, rural industry began to stagnate and China's large peasant population was seen as a hindrance to the country's development. Popular demand for further modernization, urbanization, and marketization began to outweigh the successes of the previous Township and Village Enterprises. Cui Zhiyuan and Gan Yang began to establish small, rural industries and collectives to mitigate the increasing socioeconomic gap and provide an alternative to large-scale capitalism.

Although Hegang has had the largest number of laid-off workers since 1996, the city has registered China's highest rate of economic growth. Cui Zhiyuan suggests that the cause of this phenomenon is its "combining public land ownership and the market". Hegang has focused on stimulating its real estate market to stimulate the development of related industries.

Of the Chinese Communist Party's current ideology, the idea of privatising China's countryside has not been accepted and it remains in public hands. Although most non-urban land is used privately, it cannot be sold (unlike urban property).

In 2008, the Third Session of the 17th Central Committee of the Chinese Communist Party (Chinese: 中国共产党第十七届中央委员会第三次全体会议) began a new round of land-privatization reforms, but these measures were limited; the transfer of land remains ambiguous, not "officially endorsed and encouraged".

=== Zhengzhou incident ===
On 24 December 2004, four Chinese protesters were sentenced to three-year prison terms for distributing leaflets entitled "Mao Forever Our Leader" at a gathering in Zhengzhou honouring Mao Zedong on the anniversary of his birth. Attacking the current leadership as "imperialist revisionists," the leaflets called on lower-level cadres to "change the current line (of the party) and return to the socialist road". The Zhengzhou incident is one of the first manifestations of public nostalgia for the Mao era reported by the international press, although it is unclear whether these feelings are widespread. It is an example of Marxist Chinese New Leftism in action.

=== Maoist Communist Party of China ===
A group of workers and students formed the Maoist Communist Party of China in 2008, an underground, non-recognized political party opposing the ruling Chinese Communist Party (CCP) government. A reported party manifesto, The Ten Declarations of the Maoist Communist Party of China, was posted on the Internet, in which the legitimacy of the CCP was questioned. The party advocates a reversal of the Deng Xiaoping reforms and a return to socialism.

=== Chongqing model ===
Politician Bo Xilai was promoted in October 2007 to party chief of Chongqing, a troubled province with high levels of pollution and unemployment and poor public health. Bo began a policy of expanding state-owned industries, in contrast with the rest of China, which was embracing market reforms. He led an economic reform of the region which was known as the Chongqing model and focused on expanding state influence in the economy, anti-corruption campaigns, and the promotion of "Red Culture". The policy also supported strong public welfare programs for the poor, unemployed, and elderly.

Bo began the Red Culture Movement in 2008, which promoted Maoist culture in opposition to the capitalist culture that characterized the Chinese reformists. Radio and television played Maoist propaganda and students were organized to "return to the countryside" and promote the singing of "red songs" during this period.

From 2009 to 2011, Chongqing began prosecuting alleged Triad members in the Chongqing gang trials. An estimated 4,781 people were arrested during the crackdown. The prosecution was controversial in its use of torture, forced confessions, and inhumane treatment of witnesses.

In 2013, Bo was found guilty of corruption and sentenced to life imprisonment. He is incarcerated at Qincheng Prison. Bo was removed as Chongqing's party chief and lost his seat on the Politburo. Bo's supporters formed the Zhi Xian Party to protest his conviction, but it was swiftly banned.

The Red Culture Movement drew in New Left intellectuals.

=== Xi era ===
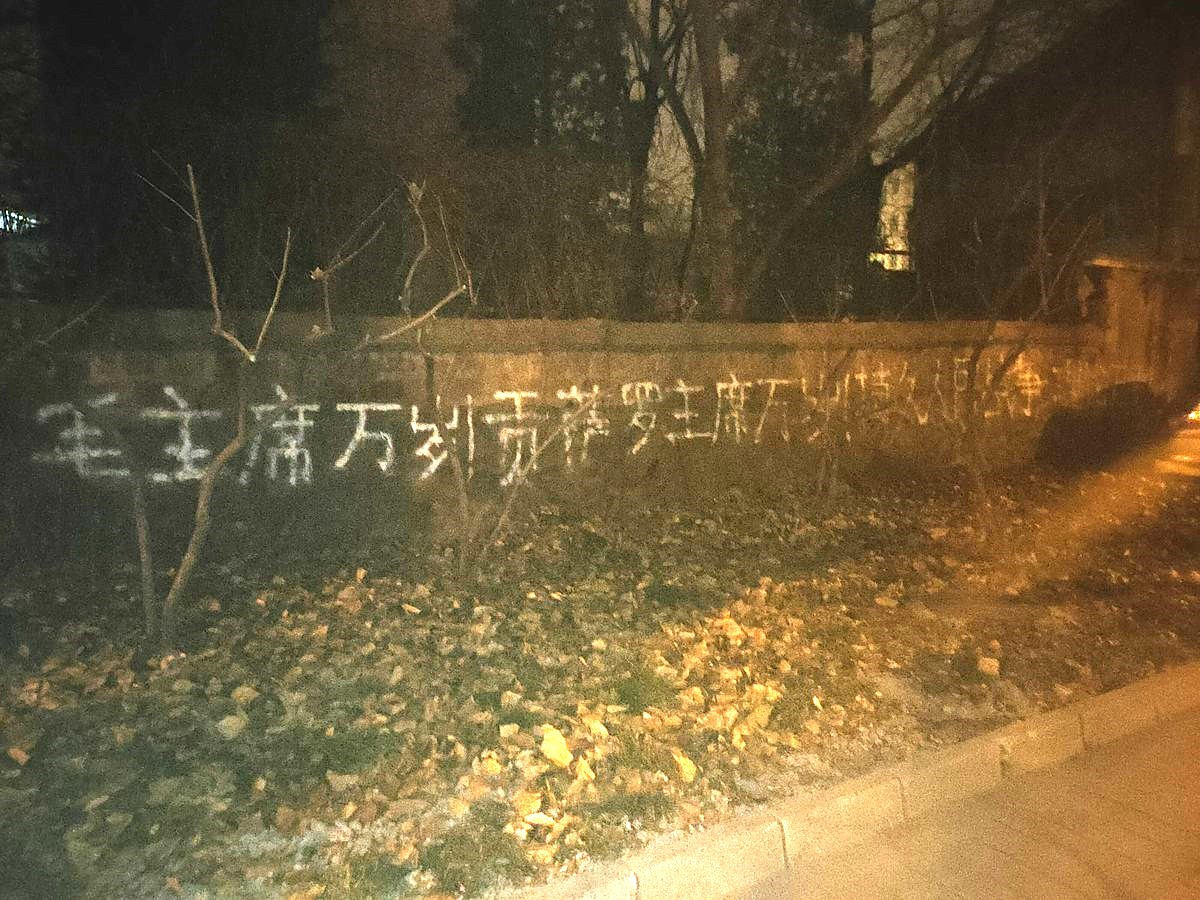
"Long live Chairman Mao! Long live Chairman Gonzalo! Long live the theory of protracted people's war!" (毛主席万岁！贡萨罗主席万岁！持久人民战争理论万岁！) graffiti on a wall at Qinghua South Road, Beijing, 6 December 2021.

The Xi administration, while imposing political controls on businesses, has also promoted greater economic liberalisation in Shenzhen, which was then held up as a model for the rest of China. In September 2020, the former mayor and party chief of Shenzhen, Li Youwei, published a sharply-worded commentary in Wen Wei Po, warning that due to the resurgence of leftists discussing class struggle, China was at a crossroads for economic reform. In 2021, The New York Times reported that Maoism is being revived among China's generation Z due to China's growing wealth gap and the 996 working hour system, as they call for a crackdown on capitalists and posting "À la lanterne!" on social media.

==== 2015 Luoyang meeting ====
In February 2015, a group from 13 provinces and municipalities in China, calling themselves "Chinese Maoists Communists", held a two-day secret meeting in Luoyang, calling for a "new socialist revolution" to "reverse the restoration of capitalism". The group seemed to claim to have party elders as backers. The group was quietly arrested. Luoyang was an industrial area that declined after the reform and opening up of the 1990s and experienced extensive unemployment as a result. Maoist nostalgia is pervasive in the city. The neo-Maoists received online support across many blogs, Weibo, and websites such as RedChina.net. However some neo-Maoist groups refused to back it, typically those who regarded Xi Jinping's policies as sufficiently aligned to their neo-Maoist agenda.

==== 2017 Guangzhou incident ====
In November 2017, a group of Maoist students and workers was arrested in Guangzhou for organizing a Maoist salon.

==== 2018 Cultural Revolution anniversary celebrations ====
On the 52nd anniversary of the beginning of the Cultural Revolution, dozens of neo-Maoists from all over China gathered in Hong Kong for commemorations, saying that their activities had been banned in the mainland. They wore Mao-era blue military uniforms and waved hammer-and-sickle flags. These Maoist groups are highly critical of the CCP's market economics, which they claim are responsible for rising inequality and corruption.

==== Jasic protests ====
A number of Maoist students participated in the July–August 2018 Jasic incident, protesting in support of factory workers and workers' rights. The students formed the Jasic Workers Solidarity Group, which included #Me Too advocate Yue Xin. The rally was largely organized through the popular far-left neo-Maoist online forum website Utopia. Fifty student advocates were later arrested; their whereabouts are unknown. Political suppression has been expanded to universities, factories, and the general public. Student leaders of the Jasic protests have been detained, punished and subjected to forced education by the CCP.

==== Common prosperity ====
After Xi's emphasis on a more equal society and promotion of the term "common prosperity", Li Guangman, a retired newspaper editor affiliated with the Chinese New Left, published an article that claims a "profound revolution" was close that would take the party closer to its socialist roots. Major Chinese state news agencies published the article, including People's Daily and Xinhua News Agency, setting off worries about parallels to the Cultural Revolution. In response, the news agencies tried to downplay the incident by not carrying the article in their print versions, some of them removing the article from their sites and, in the case of People's Daily, publishing a front-page editorial in support of market forces.

== Reactions ==
In 2010, when asked about the difference between the New Left in China and the New Left in the West, Professor Ding Xueliang of the Social Sciences Department of the Hong Kong University of Science and Technology replied that, "there is no New Left in China at all, because the primary claim of the New Left is that human rights are greater than sovereignty", "The New Left in the West, they oppose the governments of their own countries on the one hand and the monopolies of their own countries on the other. Although their practical path may not be realistic, they at least have courage. The 'New Left' in China mostly appeals to the government, so how can this be called the New Left?"

== See also ==
- Huaxi Village
- Nanjie
- Red tourism
- Communist nostalgia
- Neo-Stalinism
- Chinese Left-wing Youth
