= Chinese Left-wing Youth =

Youth community in China

The Left-wing Youth, also known as Student Leftist, Leftist Students, Progressive Youth, or Zuoqing, is a youth community of the People's Republic of China best-known for their role in the 2018 Shenzhen Jasic worker rights protests.

== Overview ==
China's left-wing youth are mainly young college students born in the 1990s, and they account a very small minority among Chinese college students. These students are usually organized in the name of reading clubs and student societies, located in major universities, with different sizes and names. These student associations include Peking University Marxist Society, Renmin University of China Xinguang Civilian Development Association, Beijing Language and Culture University Xinxin Youth Association, etc.

What these student organizations have in common is that they oppose the "Marxism" as defined by the Chinese communist party; instead, they advocate "rebellious revolution" Marxism. Since their members had supported the Shenzhen Jasic labor movement, these left-wing associations were purged by the Chinese communist authorities.

== Ideology ==
China's left-wing youth challenge the current ideology of the Chinese communist party, which points directly at the status and rights of the working class in China as a "socialist country". A member of the Peking University Marxist Society told The Washington Post that socialism with Chinese characteristics is fascism, not socialism.

They look for cultural resources for resistance in Mao Zedong Thought, especially "Rebellion is justified." Maoist leftists account for the vast majority of China's left-wing youth, but unlike the older generation of Maoist leftists, many of them have progressive gender concepts and identify with feminism, gay rights, and queer people. Apart from Maoists, left-wing youth also include Trotskyists and feminists.

In an exclusive interview with the BBC News, two left-wing young people with the pseudonyms Xiao Ming and Zheng Hua said that their ideas come from Marxism, Leninism, and Mao Zedong Thought, but more importantly, they have witnessed the reality of Chinese society: there are countless elderly people in rural areas who are helpless, countless workers who have committed suicide, whose hard work has resulted in pneumoconiosis and violent beatings, and countless women have had their fingers crushed by illegally modified machines in factories.

== Activities ==
On December 15, 2015, the Peking University Marxist Society released the "Peking University Logistics Workers Survey Report" on its WeChat official account, which pointed out that the living conditions of Peking University's logistics workers were poor. The report attracted widespread attention and media coverage.

On November 15, 2017, Zhang Yunfan, the former president of the Peking University Marxist Society, who claimed to be a "Marxist" and a "Maoist leftist", was arrested by the police when he was holding a reading meeting at Guangzhou University of Technology. He was criminally detained and charged with "gathering a crowd to disrupt social order." He was placed under residential surveillance and then released on bail pending trial on December 29.

On April 23, 2018, Yue Xin, the former president of the Peking University Marxist Society, published a signed article titled "An Open Letter to the Teachers and Students of Peking University and the School of Foreign Languages of Peking University", saying that after applying to Peking University to disclose the details of techer Shen Yang's sexual assault on female students, she had been under constant pressure from the university in recent days.

From late July to late August 2018, left-wing students of more than 20 well-known universities from various places went to Shenzhen to participate in the Jasic Workers Movement. On the evening of August 24, Xinhua News Agency published a report "Behind the Shenzhen Jasic Workers' Rights Protection Incident", claiming that the incident was "instigated by overseas non-governmental organizations," and suggesting that there were "fuelers" and overseas organizations that provided funds behind the incident. In October, Qiu Shuixing, the former Party Secretary of the Beijing National Security Bureau, was transferred to the position of Secretary of the Party Committee of Peking University.

On January 21, 2019, Chinese police collectively arrested seven students from Peking University and Renmin University of China who had participated in or supported the striking workers in Jasic Workers Movement.

On August 26, 2021, Fang Ran, a graduate of the Department of Sociology of Tsinghua University, a founding member of the former Tsinghua University Political Economy and Modern Capitalism Research Association, and a doctoral student in the Department of Sociology of the University of Hong Kong, was taken away by officers of the National Security Bureau of Nanning, Guangxi. He was detained by the authorities under Residential Surveillance at a Designated Location on suspicion of subversion of state power.

== Figures ==
- Yue Xin: graduated from the School of Foreign Languages, Peking University, former president of Peking University Marxist Society. BBC News described Yue as one of China's most influential left-wing activists of 2018. Yue disappeared shortly after the Jasic Workers Movement. She was last heard from in January 2019, when Guangdong police circulated a video of her confessing to various crimes and denouncing her own activism.
- Qiu Zhanxuan: former president of the Peking University Marxist Society and student of the Department of Sociology at Peking University. He was detained on Mao Zedong's birthday in December 2018.
- Zhang Yunfan: philosophy student of Peking University and former president of the Peking University Marxist Society. He was arrested by the police while holding a reading party on the campus of a university in Guangdong in 2017.
- Zhang Shengye: pharmacy student of Peking University who participated in the Jasic incident.
- Chen Kexin: student at Renmin University of China, participant in the Jasic Incident, and president of the Xinguang Civilian Development Association of Renmin University of China.

== Organizations ==
- Peking University Marxist Society
- Xinguang Civilian Development Association of Renmin University of China
- Beijing Language and Culture University Xinxin Youth Club
- Jasic Workers Solidarity Group

== Reception ==
Slovenian radical left-wing philosopher Slavoj Žižek discussed Yue Xin's disappearance in an article published in The Independent, arguing that it reflects the inherent contradictions in Chinese society, namely that the official state ideology of Marxism is being considered a dangerous form of regime subversion.

In order to oppose China's suppression of left-wing students organizing pro-labor groups, more than 30 left-wing scholars including Noam Chomsky and John E. Roemer jointly called for a boycott of the World Marxist Congress hosted by China. Chomsky issued a statement saying that "left-wing scholars all around the world" should join the boycott of such conferences and activities; while Romer issued a statement saying that relevant actions exposed China's political leadership as fake Marxists.

Cornell University announced the suspension of academic cooperation with Renmin University of China, which punished students who supported labor rights in Shenzhen and suppressed speech and academic freedom. The director of international programs at the school of industrial and labor relations, said Renmin University does not allow discussion of labor issues, making it impossible for joint research between the two universities to proceed.

Sociologist Pan believes that this left-wing youth movement is the true resurrection of the early radical left-wing tradition of the Chinese Communist Party in contemporary China; these left-wing youths are comparable to Mao Zedong, Deng Zhongxia, Li Lishan, et al. and will open a new chapter in China's social change.

Regarding the suppression of left-wing youth in China, Wang Dan wrote that these students believe in Marxism that emphasizes the sanctity of labor and the equality of human beings; however, the Marxism believed by the CCP headed by CCP general secretary Xi Jinping is a theory of state violence to maintain one-party dictatorship.

Scholar Letian Lei wrote that the 2010s left-wing student activism and the persecutions it suffered demonstrate, on the one hand, the possibility of an authentic Chinese New Left, and one the other hand, its frangibility under the party-state dictatorship.
