= Supply chain sustainability =

Possible positive impact of a company

Supply chain sustainability (or supply-chain sustainability) is the management of environmental, social and economic impacts and the encouragement of good governance practices, throughout the lifecycles of goods and services. There is a growing need for integrating sustainable choices into supply chain management. An increasing concern for sustainability is transforming how companies approach business. Whether motivated by their customers, corporate values or business opportunity, traditional priorities such as quality, efficiency and cost regularly compete for attention with concerns such as working conditions and environmental impact. A sustainable supply chain seizes value chain opportunities and offers significant competitive advantages for early adopters and process innovators.

== Background ==
Supply chains are critical links that connect an organization’s inputs to its outputs. Traditional challenges have included lowering costs, ensuring just-in-time delivery, and shrinking transportation times to allow better reaction to business challenges. However, the increasing environmental, social and economic costs of these networks and growing consumer pressure for eco-friendly products has led many organizations to look at supply chain sustainability as a new measure of profitable logistics management. This shift is reflected by an understanding that sustainable supply chains mean profitable supply chains.

Many companies are limited to measuring the sustainability of their own business operations and are unable to extend this evaluation to their suppliers and customers. This makes determining their true environmental and social costs highly challenging. However much progress has been made in defining supply chain sustainability and benchmarking tools are now available that enable sustainability action plans to be developed and implemented, although progress remains more limited. A study conducted in 2017 researched the correlation between supply chain position (how close or far the firm is from the end user in the supply chain) and firm performance. The study findings concluded that suppliers located farther upstream in the supply chain (farther from the end user), had the most to gain financially from sustainable supply chain management.

=== Environmental impact ===
The goods and services of the global economy produce many environmental impacts, ranging from the introduction of greenhouse gases that cause climate change, to biodiversity loss, freshwater depletion, excess biochemical flows, and introduction of novel pollutants. Initiatives to quantify these impacts across supply chain tiers through product accounting (e.g., European Product Environmental Footprints, or Environmental Product Declarations) or through corporate efforts (e.g., Greenhouse Gas Protocol for climate or Science Based Targets Network for land, water, ocean, and biodiversity). As companies are setting climate targets, suppliers’ operations can be responsible for a majority of company’s total emissions, depending on the industry and their position in the supply chain.

Some of these impacts are doubly material in that both the company's actions influence the environment, and there are risks/opportunities that affect the company's performance. For example, Climate change poses a new risk to supply chains and a need to increase their resilience.These environmental impacts are evident across industries, for example, food and beverage companies are particularly vulnerable to the impacts of climate change as changing weather patterns can disrupt agricultural production. Measuring supply chain resilience on factors such as natural resource availability, infrastructure, financial resources, and social safety networks among others, can help them respond to challenges and create better supply chains in the process.

=== Social impact ===
Besides sustainability and resilience, an ethical supply chain is imperative to ensure corporate social responsibility and adhere to a supplier code of conduct. The work environment for the workers should be congenial and must not violate the basic human rights. For instance, companies like Nike and Apple, which outsource manufacturing of their products to other countries like China, have been under the scanner for workplace conditions and wages of their workers. Consumers increasingly demand transparency and traceability in supply chains, especially where disturbing social breakdowns occur, such as with forced labour and child labour for globally traded goods.

Forced labor, understood as work that is performed involuntarily or under coercion, occurs in different industries, often upstream in the supply chain with limited visibility to buyers, customers, and end-users.

For example, in the United States, the 2010 Dodd–Frank Wall Street Reform and Consumer Protection Act requires manufacturers to audit their supply chains and report use of conflict minerals to the Securities and Exchange Commission (SEC).

=== Governance impact ===
Governance practices in global supply chains can pose risks to supply chain sustainability, alongside social and environmental factors. Governance factors include guidelines and procedures for countries and corporations. Buyers screen their supply chains for appropriate governance practices such as a company’s purpose, the role and makeup of boards of directors, shareholder rights and how corporate performance is measured.

=== Stakeholders ===
The purchasing power held by buyers, gives them significant influence over their vendors or suppliers’ business practices. Companies in the role of buyers acquire goods or services through organizational functions such as purchasing, procurement, or sourcing, typically for use or consumption in their own organization. Suppliers or vendors typically sell their goods or services to the next link in the supply chain. Buyers might thus interface with only one tier of their suppliers, while their supply chain spans across complex tiers of suppliers upstream. Progress has been made in the sustainable procurement space as companies help suppliers design and implement sustainability programs that directly support the companies' own goals. Buyers are working to achieve sustainability goals by setting standards for their suppliers' performance and treating sustainability performance similar to other business considerations such as cost, quality, and timeliness.

== Drivers for supply chain sustainability ==
One of the key requirements for developing a successful sustainable supply chain is collaboration. Where customer organisations have mandated sustainability improvements, working together requires that suppliers know what the return on their investment on those improvements is likely to be. The practice of collaboration - such as sharing distribution to reduce waste by ensuring that half-empty vehicles do not get sent out and that deliveries to the same address are on the same truck - is not widespread because many companies fear a loss of commercial control by working with others. Investment in alternative modes of transportation — such as use of canals and airships — can play an important role in helping companies reduce the cost and environmental impact of their deliveries.

In the European Union, the Corporate Sustainability Reporting Directive (CSRD) legally requires large and listed companies to disclose Scope 3 (value-chain) emissions, where material, starting with 2025 reports on 2024 data. In the United States, the SEC's 2024 climate disclosure rule similarly mandates Scope 3 reporting if emissions are material or included in corporate targets, though the regulator has recently indicated it may change them.

According to economist Klaus Schwab, customer and consumer demand for supply chain responsibility and sustainability is part of a company's value proposition under the ethical consumerism movement. A Boston Consulting Group survey reported in 2020 that 70% of consumers said they were willing to pay a 5% price premium for products produced by more sustainable means.

During global supply chain disruptions following the COVID-19 pandemic, sustainable supply chains have been shown to be more resilient and have lower supplier risk.

== Application of supply chain sustainability ==
Companies looking to implement sustainable strategies down its supply chain should also look upstream. To elaborate, if a company is able to choose between various suppliers, it can for example use its purchasing power to get its suppliers in compliance with its green supply chain standards. In managing suppliers, companies must measure that inputs from suppliers are of high quality, and the usage of water and energy is minimized leading to less pollution, defects and over production. They also must audit their supplier base and make sure that they are improving the supply chain metrics Additionally, fostering collaborative partnerships with suppliers to promote transparency and innovation can further enhance sustainability efforts throughout the supply chain.

When measuring sustainability in supply chains, consistent measurements which can be replicated and compared are crucial to encourage consumer trust. Environmental and social change often takes time to measure and must be considered by private companies or governments over a long term period to accurately assess the results. Some companies utilize supplier scorecards to determine suppliers’ sustainability performance. This can be accomplished by conducting life-cycle assessments or surveys to help determine their sustainability practices. Another strategy is to award suppliers for their improvement on their sustainability performance, for instance, by developing new materials sourced from waste or by making operations more energy efficient.

=== Software ===
Digital technology has increased companies' capability to collaborate with large numbers of suppliers. As supply chain sustainability becomes a more critical business issue, the need for reliable and robust data from suppliers increases. Whilst some existing business systems can collect some sustainability data, most large businesses will look to dedicated software providers for more specific sustainability functionality.

In order for businesses to determine the degree of sustainability impact of their business model, they must have the data to support it. Harvard Business School created the Impact-Weighted Accounts Initiative (IWAI) to assess the degree of impact that many large companies have on social, environmental, and economic areas. Impact data comes from long term research on specific, measurable topics that can be applied to future changes within a company or system. Impact data is often more sparse or inaccessible than it should be, which allows institutions such as HBS to hold companies accountable in their supply chains and encourage greater transparency. Transparency in the supply chain influences how consumers view and support companies, so improving data driven sustainability efforts can positively affect supply chain business. A company’s negative impact on environmental or social areas may show in their stock market value, exposing their true values to investors. While impact data is probably one of the better ways of assessing a company’s long term impacts, data collection for impact assessment is a lengthy process and not all companies can spend long periods of time measuring their impact without making changes. Because of this, simple, credible alternatives to long term impact assessments are necessary for some businesses.

=== On-site audits ===
In addition to digital tools, on-site audits can be an effective tool to verify social and environmental compliance at supplier sites. On-site audits can certify a supplier’s compliance with an external standard, such as SA8000, ISO 14001, SMETA 4-Pillar, and others. Audits can also assess compliance with internal policies and guidelines set by a business partner, for example through a supplier code of conduct. Depending on the auditing standard, buyers might choose to audit their suppliers directly, or send auditors from a third-party auditing firm to supplier sites.

== See also ==
- Fair Stone standard
- Sustainable procurement
