= Nanjie (disambiguation) =

Nánjiē (南街) may refer to the following locations in China:

Community

- Nanjie, Zhucheng, village in Zhucheng Subdistrict, Xinzhou District, Wuhan, Hubei

Subdistricts

- Nanjie Subdistrict, Fuzhou, in Gulou District, Fuzhou, Fujian
- Nanjie Subdistrict, Qingyang, in Xifeng District, Qingyang, Gansu
- Nanjie Subdistrict, Zhangye, in Ganzhou District, Zhangye, Gansu
- Nanjie Subdistrict, Anshun, in Xixiu District, Anshun, Guizhou
- Nanjie Subdistrict, Changchun, in Nanguan District, Changchun, Jilin
- Nanjie Subdistrict, Jinzhou, in Guta District, Jinzhou, Liaoning
- Nanjie Subdistrict, Lingyuan, Liaoning
- Nanjie Subdistrict, Shizuishan, in Huinong District, Shizuishan, Ningxia
- Nanjie Subdistrict, Changzhi, in Chengqu, Changzhi, Shanxi
- Nanjie Subdistrict, Datong, in Chengqu, Datong, Shanxi
- Nanjie Subdistrict, Jincheng, in Chengqu, Jincheng, Shanxi
- Nanjie Subdistrict, Linfen, Shanxi
- Nanjie Subdistrict, Huili County, in Huili County, Sichuan

Town

- Nanjie, Guangning County, town in Guangdong

Village

- Nanjie, Linying County, village in Henan
