= Beijing Workers' Autonomous Federation =

1989 Chinese group during the Tiananmen Square protests

BWAF
- Beijing Workers' Autonomous Federation
- 北京工人自治联合会
- Founded: April 20, 1989
- Dissolved: June 8, 1989
- Location: People's Republic of China
- Members: 3,000 – 20,000
- Key people: Han Dongfang

The Beijing Workers' Autonomous Federation (BWAF), or Beijing Workers' Autonomous Union (Chinese: 北京工人自治联合会; pinyin: Běijīng gōngrén zìzhì liánhéhuì; popularly referred to in Chinese as gōngzìlián, lit. 'workers' federation') was the primary Chinese workers' organization calling for political change during the Tiananmen Square protests of 1989. The group was formed in the wake of mourning activities for former General Secretary of the Chinese Communist Party Hu Yaobang in April 1989. The BWAF denounced political corruption, presenting itself as an independent union capable of "supervising the Communist Party," unlike the Party-controlled All-China Federation of Trade Unions (ACFTU).

Unlike typical labor unions, the BWAF did not establish branches in individual factories and workplaces. Nevertheless, its influence and activities expanded during its resistance to the imposition of martial law in May. The Federation itself was one of the casualties of the People's Liberation Army's violent suppression of protesters during the evening of June 3. After the military crackdown, Party authorities labeled the BWAF an "illegal organization" and arrested its leaders.

== Origins ==
The reform and opening up initiated by Deng Xiaoping had improved the living standard of many urban workers, but by 1988, many such workers considered themselves "losers in the decade of economic reform." Corruption and inflation especially angered workers, and some responded with slowdowns and wildcat strikes in 1988 to 1989.

In the days after Hu Yaobang's death on April 15, 1989, workers and other Beijing residents mourned and discussed politics at the Monument to the People's Heroes in Tiananmen Square. On April 20, after university students staging a sit-in outside Zhongnanhai claimed to have been beaten by military police, a group of workers calling themselves the "Beijing Workers' Autonomous Federation" began issuing two handbills. The first, the "Letter to People of the Entire City," decried "out of control" inflation, criticized corrupt officials, and called on "people from all walks of life to come together to fight for truth and the future of China." The second handbill, "Ten Questions," demanded that top Communist Party leaders reveal how much money Zhao Ziyang spent playing golf, and how much Deng Xiaoping's son's spent gambling on horse racing. The pamphlet also questioned why "prices had risen without respite whilst the living standards of the people had dropped precipitously," asking top Party leaders disclose their income. These handbills, along with fiery speeches in Tiananmen Square, helped recruit more workers to the Federation. One such recruit was Han Dongfang, a railway worker who would become one of the BWAF's top leaders.

== Activities ==
In late April and the first half of May, between 70 and 80 activist workers met regularly at Tiananmen Square's western viewing stand but did not openly identify as the BWAF. In the week following students' declaration of a hunger strike on May 13, however, the BWAF began operating openly. During this period, Federation members sought assistance from the ACFTU, China's only officially sanctioned labor union. Although the ACFTU had previously encouraged workers to oppose corruption and had donated 100,000 yuan in medical aid for the hunger strikers, they did not help the BWAF.

Rebuffed in its attempts to register the organization with government authorities, the group proclaimed its founding on May 18. A handbill dated May 20 declared that the BWAF as a "transitional organisation that the workers of the capital have spontaneously created during an extraordinary period." Its stated goals included advancement of democracy, opposition to dictatorship, and support of the hunger striking students. According to sociologists Andrew G. Walder and Gong Xiaoxia, the BWAF wanted to independently represent workers' interests, rather than deal with specific proposals about workplace issues.

Membership in the BWAF continued to grow in the early days of June, although estimates of specific numbers vary widely; one scholar writes that the group "claimed three thousand members," while two former BWAF activists said that the group had registered "almost 20,000 members" by June 3. Membership was limited to people who could prove Beijing residency and affiliation with a work unit.

== Relationship with student protesters ==
Scholars disagree about whether the BWAF cooperated or clashed with student protesters. Sociologist Dingxin Zhao writes that student leaders, including Li Jinjin, a law student at Peking University, and Zhou Yongjun of the China University of Political Science and Law, helped the BWAF by drafting documents and providing legal advice. Students also supplied the Federation with broadcasting equipment and banners. Zhao therefore concludes that the BWAF "was basically only an appendage of the student movement."

However, Walder and Gong's interviews with former members portray significant friction between the workers and students, suggesting that the two groups had conflicting goals. Particularly, the workers were more critical of economic reforms, and the Communist Party leaders associated with them, than the students were. For example, while many students expressed sympathy toward Zhao Ziyang and the reform faction, especially after Zhao's visit to Tiananmen Square on May 19, the BWAF remained "consistently critical of Zhao Ziyang even after his fall from power." In addition, former Federation members felt marginalized by the students' insistence on maintaining the purity of the movement. At least twice in May, students stopped workers from establishing a headquarters in Tiananmen Square. At the end of the month, students finally allowed them to move from the western viewing stand into the square itself.

== Dissolution ==
The PLA's armed crackdown against protesters ended the Beijing Workers' Autonomous Federation's short existence. Late on the evening of June 3, a group of young people escorted BWAF leader Han Dongfang away from Tiananmen Square. As the youth tried to persuade him to leave, they compared him to Polish Solidarity leader Lech Wałęsa. Han fled on his bicycle to the neighboring Hebei province. On June 8, the Martial Law Command Headquarters issued a public notice declaring the BWAF was an illegal organization and ordering it to disband. The notice said that Federation leaders were among "the main instigators and organizers in the capital of the counter-revolutionary rebellion." BWAF members were arrested and imprisoned; after Han turned himself in to police, he was imprisoned for 22 months without trial until he contracted tuberculosis and was released in April 1991.

== See also ==
- Government of the People's Republic of China
- People's Liberation Army at Tiananmen Square protests of 1989
- Finances of Student Organizations during the Tiananmen Square Protests of 1989
