= Han Dongfang =

Chinese dissident

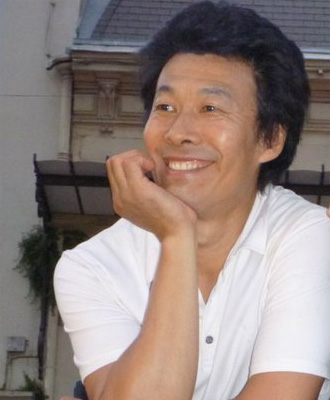
- Han Dongfang in 2011
- Born: August 19, 1963 (age 62); Nanweiquan, Shanxi, China
- Citizenship: China (1963–1993); Stateless (1993–1997); China (1997–present)
- Occupations: Train electrician, trade union activist, dissident, radio host, journalist
- Known for: BWAF student leader, CLB founder

Chinese name
- Traditional Chinese: 韓東方
- Simplified Chinese: 韩东方
Transcriptions
Standard Mandarin
- Hanyu Pinyin: Hán Dōngfāng
- Gwoyeu Romatzyh: Harn Dongfang
- Wade–Giles: Han Tung-fang
Yue: Cantonese
- Yale Romanization: Hòhn Dūng-fōng
- Jyutping: Hon^{4} Dung^{1}-fong^{1}

Han Dongfang (Chinese: 韩东方; born 1963) is a Chinese advocate for workers' rights.

Han was born in the impoverished village of Nanweiquan in Shanxi and first came to international prominence as a railway worker in Beijing. He helped set up the Beijing Workers’ Autonomous Federation (BWAF) during the Tiananmen Square protests of 1989. The BWAF was the People's Republic of China's first independent trade union, established as an alternative to the Party-controlled All-China Federation of Trade Unions.

The BWAF was disbanded after the June 4 crackdown, and Han was placed at the top of the Chinese government's most-wanted list. He turned himself in to the police and was imprisoned for 22 months without trial until he contracted tuberculosis in prison and was released in April 1991. He spent a year in the U.S. undergoing medical treatment before returning to China in August 1993. On his return, he was arrested in Guangzhou and expelled to Hong Kong, where he still lives today.

In 1994, he established China Labour Bulletin, a Hong Kong-based non-governmental organization that seeks to uphold and defend the rights of workers across China.

In addition to his work at CLB, Han conducts regular interviews with workers and peasants across China on Radio Free Asia. These interviews give insight into lives of workers in China and are broadcast three times weekly on shortwave radio.

== Education and work ==
Han graduated high school in Beijing but did not attend college or university. Despite this, he was an avid reader of everything from Greek to Chinese classics and worked as an assistant librarian at Beijing Normal University. In 1983, attracted by higher wages, Han began a job at the Fengtai Locomotive Maintenance Section in Beijing. While working there his feelings about workers' rights were emboldened, as he saw China's "savage" economic policies had a lack for regard for China's "society and environment." Because of this, Han believed that workers needed to protect and represent their own interests, which most likely served as a key incentive for him to join the BWAF.

== Public Security Soldiers Corps ==
In 1980, Han decided to join the Gong An Bing, or Public Security Soldiers Corps. After going through basic training at the Qinghe prison labor camp, he was given command of a squad consisting of 12 men. During an annual review of the camp, he claimed that officers were stealing a third of the food rations from his men, and that his men were also being beaten and abused. Han claimed that these acts were in violation of Chairman Mao's teachings that officers and soldiers should share good and bad fortunes and be treated as equals. Han's application to join the Communist Party was allegedly destroyed by a battalion commandant the following day.

== Tiananmen Square ==
On April 17, 1989, Han gave a speech at the Tiananmen Square protests that praised the moral courage of the students at the Square and advocated for the protection and constitutional right for Chinese workers to freely organize. During this speech, he also focused his attention towards the People's Liberation Army, claiming that the army and the people "are like fish and water" and should not antagonize or attack one another. While it was considered normal for many workers to hide their identities in the early stages of the protests, Han gave his name freely to those who asked. He said he did this because he felt like he needed to set an example and encourage others to own their words and be prepared to "face the consequences" for what they said. He made more impromptu speeches throughout the movement, often accompanied by his wife Chen Jingyun.

Despite Han's speeches and fervor for the movement, many student protesters at Tiananmen Square were apprehensive and questioned whether or not workers should be welcome or permitted into the Tiananmen protests. Many of the student leaders, particularly the security members, were concerned about the movement being infiltrated by government agents or police who would purposefully provoke violence or "hooliganism." Likewise, many students felt that the movement needed to remain solely run by students to avoid giving the government grounds for accusing them of trying to start a revolution.

== Beijing Workers' Autonomous Federation ==
Han joined the movement and became a leader within BWAF when its membership numbered just a few hundred. Han and Li Jinjin wrote appeals for workers and students to join in the Tiananmen protests. The BWAF tried to read some of these documents on the student owned loudspeakers in Tiananmen Square, but were turned down by the students. Undeterred, the BWAF pooled their money together and bought their own hand cranked system to use as a loudspeaker.

Han said that he saw the BWAF as an opportunity to educate workers about China's constitution and how much of their rights were not put into practice. He did not have much faith that the BWAF or the Tiananmen Protests would survive very long, but he felt that the BWAF was important since its legacy would live on through the workers who would be educated about China's constitution.

== Han's arrest after Tiananmen protests ==
After finding out he was at the top of the most wanted list, Han wanted to avoid the "humiliation" of being tracked down the police and turned himself in to "straighten out" the police and tell them what really happened at the protests. He then spent 22 months in prison, where he often debated with interrogators and prison guards about the formation of the Tiananmen protests, particularly about the protests' spontaneous rather than planned nature. He was freed in 1992 after an international campaign pressured the Chinese government to release him to the United States for treatment of tuberculosis, which he contracted while imprisoned. Han then attempted to travel back to China but was expelled to Hong Kong, where he founded the China Labor Bulletin.

== Awards ==
- 1993 Democracy Award
- 1996 Bremen Solidarity Prize
- 2005 Gleitsman International Activist Award

== Video external links ==
- Han Dongfang's Youtube page – videos of Han's call-in program with Radio Free Asia (Mandarin language)
- Social Justice and Harmony in China: Trade Union Movement – talk by Han to UCLA International Institute on June 2, 2005
- When will we have Free Unions in China? – online video of speech given in February 2007 in Montreal
- Speech by Han on unions to SEIU United Healthcare Workers-West on March 8, 2008
