= Qiu Zhanxuan =

Chinese student activist

- 邱占萱
- Born: 1998 (age 27–28); Chongqing, China
- Education: Peking University
- Occupations: Student, activist
- Organization: Peking University Marxist Society

Qiu Zhanxuan (Chinese: 邱占萱; pinyin: Qiū Zhànxuān; born 1998) is a Chinese student activist and Marxist. Qiu was president of the Peking University Marxist Society, a Marxist study group, until 28 December 2018.

== Youth ==
Qiu's father and uncles were laid off by the state during China's 1990s reforms. Although his father started a business, his uncles who lost their jobs could not even afford to make $1.50 family Mahjong bets. This had a great impression on Qiu.

Qiu won the gold medal in the national Chemistry Olympiad and received a rare full scholarship in 2016. Qiu switched his major from chemistry to sociology in his second year and joined the Marxist club and became its president.

== 2018 abduction ==
On 26 December 2018, Qiu was detained by police while on his way to a celebration of Mao Zedong's birthday.

== 2019 detention and torture ==
Authorities detained Qiu again for four days in February 2019. Qiu said the police asked him to quit labour activism and drop out of Peking University. He said the authorities "slapped him until blood streamed from his nose, and they jammed headphones into his ears and played hours of propaganda at full volume. The police also made him bend over a table naked and spread his buttocks, joking darkly that they would teach him how to insert a listening device. This all happened on campus."

Qiu disappeared on 29 April 2019. His classmates said State security agents seized him from Beijing's outskirts that day. In August 2023, Photon Media wrote that Qiu has been released and taught Chemistry Olympiad courses on an online course platform.

== See also ==
- Chinese Left-wing Youth
