= Maoist Communist Party of China =

- Founded: 26 December 2008
- Ideology: Communism; Marxism–Leninism–Maoism; Anti-revisionism
- Political position: Far-left
- Colours: Red

Party flag
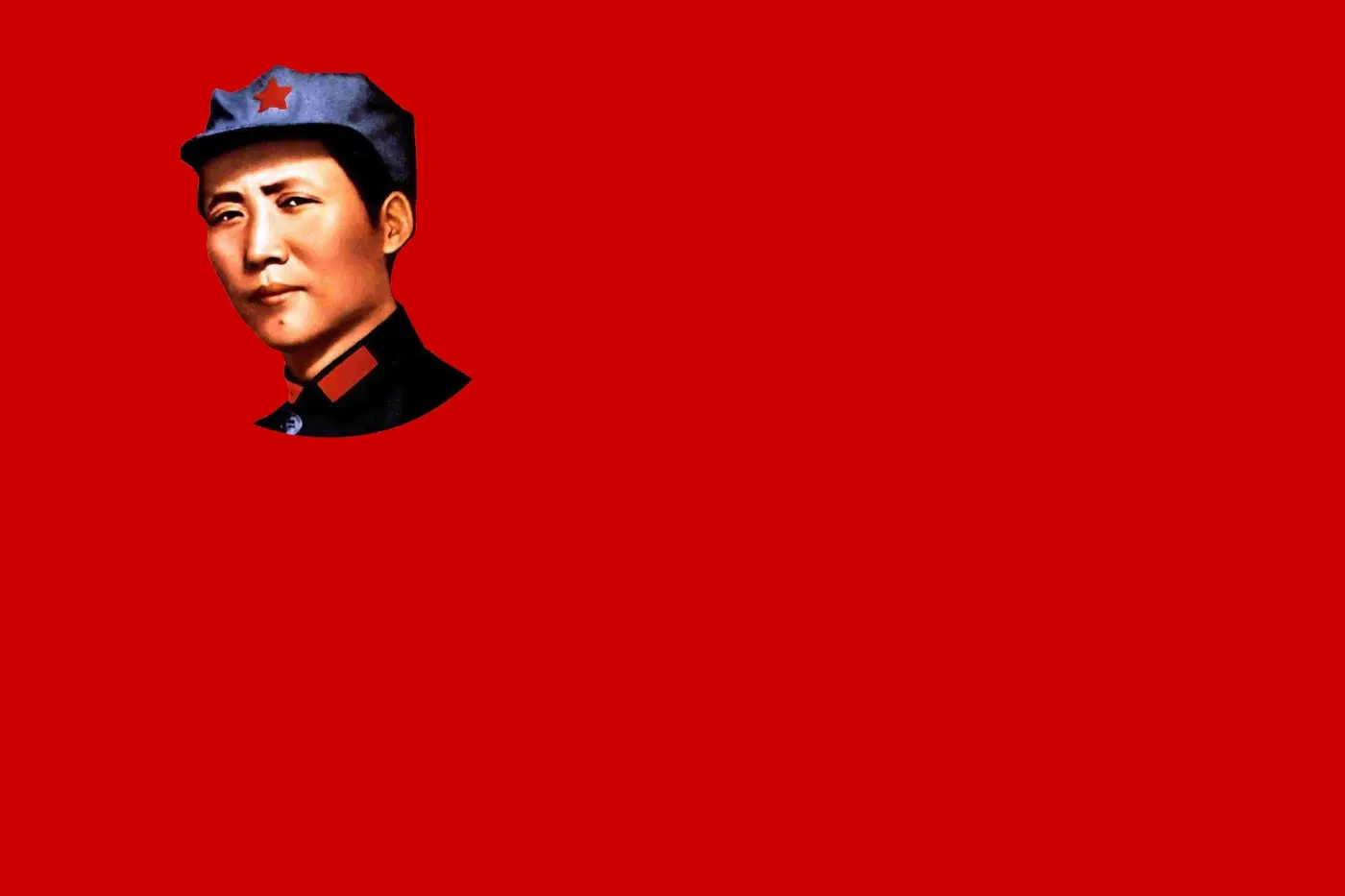

Chinese name
- Simplified Chinese: 中国毛泽东主义共产党
- Traditional Chinese: 中國毛澤東主義共產黨
- Literal meaning: China Mao Zedongist Communist Party
Transcriptions
Standard Mandarin
- Hanyu Pinyin: Zhōngguó Máo Zédōng Zhǔyì Gòngchǎndǎng
Yue: Cantonese
- Jyutping: Zung^{1}gwok^{3} Mou^{4} Zaak^{6}dung^{1} Zyu^{2}ji^{6} Gung^{6}caan^{2}dong^{2}

The Maoist Communist Party of China (MCPC) (Note: Chinese: 中国毛泽东主义共产党; pinyin: Zhōngguó Máo Zédōng Zhǔyì Gòngchǎndǎng; lit. 'China Mao Zedongist Communist Party') is an underground communist party in China adhering to Marxism–Leninism–Maoism. The party was established in 2008 by Chinese leftists opposed to the policy of reform and opening up pursued by the Chinese Communist Party (CCP) after the death of Mao Zedong. Its members have been arrested and jailed by Chinese authorities.

== History ==
The MCPC was established in 26 December 2008, the birthday of Mao Zedong. On the internet and through leaflets in big cities like Shanghai, the Party distributed a "Letter to the People of the Nation" on 26 December 2008 and January 2009. In the letter, the Party calls the ruling Chinese Communist Party (CCP) a "revisionist ruling group", and that the reform and opening up policies implemented by the CCP represent a "complete restoration of capitalist line". The article accused the "revisionist CCP" of being a "reactionary organization" that "led wolves into the house and sold out territory, territorial waters, mines, resources, banks, factories, roads, bridges, and national dignity, turning the CCP into a vassal of US imperialism." The article also criticized Deng Xiaoping of being an "unrepentant capitalist roader", and claimed the MCPC uses Mao Zedong Thought as its guide to action. It called on Chinese people to overthrow the "fake Communist Party" and also turn against the "reactionary elites" who signed the dissident Charter 08.

Maoist activist Ma Houzhi was arrested on 15 October 2009 for organising an MCPC meeting in Chongqing. According to Radio Free Asia, Ma put Chongqing Party Secretary Bo Xilai as either general secretary or honorary chairman of the MCPC. He was sentenced to ten years in prison and released in 2019. On 12 May 2021, on the eve of the 100th anniversary of the CCP, Ma was again arrested.

== Ideology ==
The MCPC adheres to Marxism–Leninism–Maoism. It is strongly against economic reforms pursued by the CCP which have, according to the party, "restored capitalist social conditions". As such, it seeks to overthrow the "traitorous revisionist ruling bloc within the Chinese Communist Party" by initiating a "second socialist revolution" to re-establish the dictatorship of the proletariat. The ultimate objective of MCPC is to achieve communism.

== See also ==
- Chinese New Left
- Jasic Workers Solidarity Group
- Zhi Xian Party
