= Gan Yang =

Chinese political philosopher (born 1952)

- 甘陽
- Born: 1952 (age 73–74); Shenyang, Liaoning, China

Academic background
- Education: Heilongjiang University (B.A., 1982); Peking University (M.A., 1985); University of Chicago
- Influences: Cassirer; Confucius; Foucault; Fromm; Heidegger; Marcuse; Strauss

Academic work
- Discipline: Political philosophy
- School or tradition: Cultural conservatism Straussianism
- Institutions: Chinese University of Hong Kong; Sun Yat-sen University (2009–present)

Gan Yang (born 1952; Chinese: 甘陽; pinyin: Gān Yáng) is a Chinese political philosopher, "Confucian socialist". He is dean of the Liberal Arts College at Sun Yat-sen University, and was formerly professor of political philosophy at the Chinese University of Hong Kong.

== Career ==
Born in 1952 in Shenyang, Gan was raised in Hangzhou, Fujian. Gan was a Red Guard in the early years of the Cultural Revolution, but became disillusioned with the movement and was sent to labour in the Greater Khingan Mountains in 1970. He was admitted to Heilongjiang University after the death of Mao Zedong, graduating in 1982. Gan then pursued graduate studies in philosophy at Peking University, where he was a classmate of Liu Xiaofeng. At Beijing he developed an interest in continental philosophy, particularly the thought of Martin Heidegger and the Neo-Kantians. He graduated with a master's degree in 1985 and played an important role in disseminating Western philosophy in China in the late 1980s.

In 1989, Gan enrolled as a PhD student under the Committee of Social Thought at the University of Chicago, but left Chicago ten years later without a doctorate. He was appointed professor of political philosophy at the Chinese University of Hong Kong, then moved to Sun Yat-sen University as dean of the Liberal Arts College (Boya College) in 2009, where he presided over a general reform of liberal arts at the university on Straussian lines, emphasising Chinese, Latin, and Ancient Greek classics.

Gan was described in 2013 as "one of the most prominent political philosophers of contemporary China".

== Views ==
Gan started his academic career as a liberal and a disciple of Western Enlightenment philosophy, but, influenced by Ernst Cassirer, he began to alter his views in 1987, cautioning that there were Western philosophers who had exposed the limits of reason as a philosophical principle. Gan then adopted a more culturally conservative position, arguing that a return to Confucianism was necessary to counterbalance the negative aspects of modernisation in China. For Gan at this stage of his thinking, freedom at the individual level was a higher concern than democracy and science, the two catchwords of the May Fourth Movement: Chinese intellectuals had so far "never dared to regard 'the freedom of individuals' as the first principle". He initially supported the Chinese democracy movement and the 1989 Tiananmen Square protests.

After moving to Chicago in 1989, Gan became increasingly influenced as a student of Allan Bloom by American conservative philosophy and the thought of Leo Strauss. In a preface to a Chinese translation of Strauss's Natural Right and History in 2003, Gan drew on Strauss's thought to argue that the predominant danger of persecution in philosophy was not the persecution of the philosopher by an unphilosophical wider society, but the persecution of the multitude by the philosopher. Modern philosophy has "gone mad", Gan states, and is promoting the continual remaking of politics according to competing philosophical abstractions; in light of the "politicization of philosophy" and the "philosophization of politics", philosophy has become a disease which must be controlled.

In the 1990s, Gan shortly joined the emerging Chinese New Left. Some labelled Gan as part of the Chinese New Left, which he "never truly accepted" and even "resented". Some scholars have identified the Chinese New Left as a conservative movement and in defense of hierarchy in the name of equality. Gan stated: "I am more concerned with how to re-cultivate a healthy conservative mentality and attitude in a post-revolutionary society, a conservative, gradualist reforming way of looking at current issues and social change."

In Gan's view, Chinese conservatism should incorporate Mao-era socialist egalitarianism and Deng era market reformism so as to "unify three heritages into a single strand". This view the political idea of "three heritages", through which the Gongyang thinker Dong Zhongshu wrote that "a new king must keep safe the heritage of the two [earlier] kings as a means of maintaining the connection". After 2000, he announced his support for the establishment of a "socialist Confucian republic". According to Gan, the ideal of a Confucian socialist republic is already embodied in the official name of the People's Republic of China: the title of "People's Republic" demarcates the country as a socialist republic constituted by workers and peasants and not a capitalist state, while the name "China" itself invokes the Confucian tradition of Chinese civilisation.

Commenting upon China's reform process, Gan has criticised linear models of economic development and suggested that the model of Township and Village Enterprises in the Chinese countryside offers an alternative vision of modernity to the Western capitalist world order. While other scholars such as Qin Hui dismissed the importance of the TVEs, Gan suggested that by avoiding the pronounced urban–rural divide characteristic of Western industrialisation, cooperative forms of industry like the TVEs could effect a more dispersed form of development that would preserve traditional rural industries in China.

Gan contends that since the 1970s, American Straussians have used esotericism to replace the liberal-egalitarian elements of the American ideological creed with classical and aristocratic ideals. In Gan's view, the deceptive methods used by the United States to justify its 2003 invasion of Iraq came from the doctrines of the Straussian school.

Gan criticizes what he deems as political correctness imposed by "tenured radicals" in American university humanities departments. According to Gan, a trend of hedonistic liberalism had led to the "closing of the American mind".

Gan has been influenced both by Western postmodernists, such as Michel Foucault, and by Western Marxism, including the thought of Erich Fromm and Herbert Marcuse.

== Works in English ==
- Gan, Yang (2001). "The citizen and the constitution". In Chen, Chaohua (ed.). One China, Many Paths. London and New York: Verso. pp. 257–273. ISBN 1844675351.
- ——— (2003). "Debating liberalism and democracy in China in the 1990s". In Zhang, Xudong (ed.). Whither China?: Intellectual Politics in Contemporary China. Durham and London: Duke University Press. pp. 79–101. ISBN 0822326485.
- ——— (2004). "The Chinese Idea of Universities and the Beida Reform". Chinese Education & Society. 37 (6): 85–97. doi:10.1080/10611932.2004.11031670. S2CID 143345589.
