= Student posters and leaflets during the 1989 Tiananmen Square protests and massacre =

During the 1989 Tiananmen Square protests and massacre, many big-character posters, banners and leaflets appeared. These posters and leaflets became an important source throughout the course of the student movement. They provided valuable information and insight into the goals, slogans and instructions that were to guide students about what they were expected to do during the protests. A central place where posters and leaflets were printed and posted was at "the Triangle", located at Peking University. The Triangle, also known as a democracy wall, was "a wall of bulletin boards erected around a triangle of land in the centre of the campus". The Triangle became a democratic space where students, teachers and Chinese citizens went in order to voice their opinions and feelings towards the movement, to know the progress and course of the movement, and to provide information on events and incidents (Student Hunger Strikes and "Xinhua Gate Incident"—Zhongnanhai). The Triangle was considered "a marketplace for information and was regarded as a symbolic space for free expression."

== Importance of Posters and Leaflets ==
As the movement progressed many poems and short essays were also pasted at the base of the Monument to the People's Heroes informing people about ideas and tactics that were emerging during the course of the movement. The Monument to the People's Heroes became "the center stage as cries for democracy were pasted and broadcast from it during the movement." Posters appeared on the monument describing events that others may not have had the chance to witness such as the student petition submitted on April 22 which government officials declined to receive, and the Xinhua Gate Incident involving alleged police brutality towards students. Ideas also appeared in handbills and student papers that were passed out in and around the Square. Ideas and slogans during the movement began as posters on campuses, and were later converted to leaflets and handbills. Big and small character posters became the main way to report news and express viewpoints on campuses. The ideas they expressed spread by word of mouth, or by individuals who had hand copied the contents. To express news and ideas quickly, efficiently, and accurately the "propaganda teams of student organizations created handbills explaining movement activities, and they went to the streets" to hand out leaflets to the public. Nonofficial papers such as the News Herald and the Hunger Strikers' News Bulletin and News Flashes were printed and distributed to inform of "pro-democracy activities and to include student grievances." Posters and leaflets appeared around universities throughout China, but they were mainly concentrated in Beijing. Big-character posters became a way for individuals to express their views and to collectively share ideas and opinions regarding the government and movement.

== Posters and Slogans ==
Class boycott posters and slogans such as the ones below appeared on leaflets and information boards across university campuses throughout China.

Items to note regarding the boycott of classes:
1. Boycott classes, not studies.
2. During the class boycott please do not return home or march without authorization. Respect normal school rules and daily schedules.
3. Further announcements of student activities during the class boycott will be made.
~People's University (Renmin University of China) Student Union big-character poster

Slogans:
Give me democracy or give me death Long live democracy!
Oppose corruption in government; oppose special privileges!
Patriotism is not a crime!
Long live the people!

== Influence of Posters and Leaflets ==
When student activists wanted to organize a demonstration all they needed to do was, "put several posters at the Triangle, write down the time and location of the gathering, the purposes of the demonstration, and the slogans to be used" and on the day of the demonstration, students would be mobilized and ready to go. Students regularly gathered at the Triangle to begin their marches to Tiananmen Square. Since the media was under state control students depended on big-character posters, student-controlled broadcasting stations, and word of mouth for information. Word of mouth information became a way for rumors about government divisions and brutality to spread, leading to the misinterpretation of information, and wrong ideas being spread. Government documents explain that after the Xinhua Gate incident "Posters reading boycott and Protest the violence of police beatings of students appeared in the Triangle area on campus and that the students were presenting "distorted reports of these events."

== Non-Student Posters and After the Tiananmen Square Protests ==
Posters and leaflets centered on themes of "free press, free association, democracy/reforms, more freedoms and [ending] official corruption." However, during the lead up to and after June 4, cartoons ridiculing government and Party officials emerged. Posters of Party leaders such as Li Peng and Deng Xiaoping began to appear at the Triangle. Party leaders were represented as fascist pigs, or they had their face on Empress Dowager Cixi's body. Along with student posters on campuses across China there were nonstudent posters from teachers, workers, and peasants expressing their support for students, and providing words of advice. After 1989 onwards such democratic posters and leaflets began to disappear from the Triangle and TOEFL exam posters, Shanghai dance posters, movie posters, and job advertisements have taken their place. The Triangle has now become an "internet bulletin board that is carefully monitored by authorities."
