= China Labor Watch =

Labor rights organization headquartered in United States

- 中国劳工观察
- Abbreviation: CLW
- Established: 2000; 26 years ago
- Founder: Li Qiang
- Type: NGO
- Tax ID no.: 11-3596560
- Legal status: 501(c)(3) organization
- Headquarters: 127 West 30th Street; 9th Floor #960; New York, New York 10001
- Location: United States
- Coordinates: 40.7480017°N 73.9934139°W
- Region served: China
- Methods: Training, advocacy, investigation
- Field: Labor rights
- Official languages: English, Chinese
- Executive Director: Li Qiang
- Vice Chair: William J. Hurst
- Treasurer: Miles Liu
- Secretary: Jill Tucker
- Board of directors: Dorothy J. Solinger, Wenchi Yu
- Website: chinalaborwatch.org

China Labor Watch (CLW) is a U.S.-based non-profit organization founded in 2000 by labor activist Li Qiang. The organization focuses on investigating labor conditions affecting Chinese workers and raising awareness of labor rights issues. CLW conducts investigations, produces reports, offers educational programs for workers, and operates a hotline to provide support and resources for workers facing labor-related issues.

== History ==
Li Qiang, the founder of CLW, became aware of exploitative labor conditions in China while working in his hometown in Sichuan Province. Motivated by these experiences, Qiang began advocating for workers' rights and conducted his first factory investigation in 1999. Over the following three years, he worked in various factories, offering guidance to workers on how to protect their rights.

Concerned for his safety, Qiang left China and entered the United States on a humanitarian visa. Once in the U.S., he noted a lack of awareness about the conditions faced by Chinese workers, which led him to establish China Labor Watch.

Initially, CLW focused on reporting labor issues in China, including labor protests and government policies related to labor exploitation. Since its founding, CLW has investigated numerous factories in China and published its findings. In 2021, it expanded its scope to investigate labor conditions and advocate for Chinese workers in other countries.

== Overview ==
Since 2000, CLW has provided training to workers on labor rights and legal processes, conducted assessments, published reports, and had been featured in media outlets.

CLW investigates working conditions in global supply chains and publishes independent reports based on its findings. The organization collaborates with civil society groups, trade unions, government stakeholders, and media outlets to raise awareness of ongoing labor violations and malpractices. In some cases, CLW engages with multinational corporations to encourage adherence to international labor standards and address worker treatment issues in China.

The organization also provides training on labor rights, legal processes, workplace negotiations, and other forms of advocacy. Additionally, CLW works towards building networks of solidarity among workers so as to address labor exploitation. It operates a hotline where workers can report violations, seek advice, connect with legal assistance, or receive further consultation.

== Investigations ==
Since its inception, CLW has conducted investigations into labor conditions within global supply chains, focusing on industries such as electronics, toys, automotive, and apparel. These investigations have documented various labor violations, including child labor, excessive working hours, unpaid wages, exploitation, the illegal use of student and dispatch workers, and workplace deaths and injuries.

CLW has engaged with international brands, government entities, and media organizations to raise awareness of these labor issues and advocate for improvements in working conditions within global supply chains. In response to CLW's reports, companies such as Apple have made adjustments to worker pay and benefits, and have modified some labor practices at certain suppliers. Other companies, such as Samsung, have reportedly conducted additional audits to investigate the issues raised in CLW's findings. CLW has also met with representatives from companies like Disney and collaborated with other labor organizations to release joint statements calling for labor rights improvements. Additionally, CLW has partnered with international media outlets, including The Guardian, to publish reports on labor conditions in China's supply chains.

== Interventions ==
- 2000: Li Qiang testified before the U.S. Congress, opposing the granting of favored nation trade status to China. He stated that Chinese laborers were being underpaid, earning as little as twenty-three cents per hour.
- 2001: After CLW assisted, laid-off workers from a VTech factory in Guangdong Province received legally mandated unemployment benefits through a court case.
- 2002: CLW helped 1,000 workers who were laid off by a state-owned company in Panjin, Liaoning Province, secure 450,000 RMB in legally owed compensation.
- 2004: CLW, alongside other activist organizations, advocated for the release of ten workers from Stella International, who had been imprisoned. This effort included hiring labor lawyers and urging companies linked to Stella to seek leniency.
- 2004: CLW began advocating for Chinese factory owners to provide injury insurance to workers. In 2007, the Chinese government implemented a requirement for factories to offer such insurance, partly as a result of these efforts.
- 2005: Li Qiang testified before the U.S.-China Economic and Security Review Commission regarding labor issues.
- 2005: CLW's legal aid program helped approximately one hundred workers in Shenzhen recover unpaid wages and educated around eight hundred workers on labor law.
- 2006: CLW helped organize a petition involving ten thousand workers in Shenzhen advocating for better labor rights protections.
- 2012: Li Qiang testified before the U.S. Congress to discuss working conditions in China and the failures of the labor auditing system.
- 2014: Li Qiang testified in Congress again regarding labor violations in the toy industry, based on CLW's findings.
- 2017: Three CLW investigators were detained in China while conducting research at Ivanka Trump's factory. They were released on bail after a month, and acquitted a year later when charges were dropped, following advocacy by CLW.

== Impact ==
=== Child labor ===
CLW has conducted investigations into child labor in global supply chains.

In 2009, CLW published a report on a supplier to Disney, revealing cases of underage labor, low wages, mandatory overtime, and unsafe working conditions. CLW's findings indicated that underage workers as young as 13 were employed at the facility. Following the report, Disney initiated a remediation plan for the factory, which included the implementation of age verification measures and improved working conditions such as introduction of rest days and increased compensation for work-related injuries. CLW subsequently continued to investigate other Disney suppliers, reporting similar issues related to child labor and poor working conditions.

In 2014, CLW reported the use of child labor, student labor, and excessive overtime in a Samsung supplier factory in southern China, shortly after a Samsung audit had found no evidence of underage labor in its supply chain. While Samsung initially denied the allegations, citing its own internal audits, a follow-up investigation by Samsung confirmed some of the issues raised by CLW. Samsung then suspended the factory and worked with CLW to address the findings.

CLW's reports on child labor have also been cited by the U.S. Department of Labor in its List of Goods Produced by Child Labor or Forced Labor.

=== Student labor ===
CLW has also investigated labor conditions related to the use of student interns in global supply chains.

In 2018, a report by CLW on the use of student interns at a Foxconn factory highlighted issues related to illegal labor practices and excessive overtime. The report was shared with Amazon's founder Jeff Bezos, prompting a response from the company, which referred to its independent audits and Supplier Code of Conduct. The Guardian conducted a further investigation on these claims, sending a reporter to China to verify the findings. The report led to an investigation by Amazon, which found violations related to overtime compensation, and initiated corrective actions with Foxconn.

In 2019, following reports alleging that student interns as young as 16 were being hired to work overtime at a Foxconn factory, Amazon responded by stating that it had investigated the issue, initiated weekly reviews, and addressed the matter with Foxconn's senior management.

In 2022, CLW released another report on a different Foxconn factory, Hengyang Foxconn, identifying additional labor violations. As a result, nearly 1 million RMB was paid to raise the wages of temporary workers and to increase the number of permanent employees.

=== Belt and Road Initiative ===
Since 2020, CLW has reported on labor conditions related to the Chinese-invested Belt and Road Initiative (BRI), focusing on issues such as nickel mining, overseas labor, and forced labor. The organization has monitored the impact of BRI projects on migrant Chinese workers, highlighting their vulnerability to exploitation in some cases.

CLW has also supported Chinese workers overseas affected by COVID-19 restrictions, helping facilitate their return by coordinating with local authorities and embassies, and providing legal assistance. The organization has raised concerns about practices such as passport confiscation and recruitment fees, which it views as forms of exploitation.

== Funding ==
CLW receives funding from project grants provided by various government or quasi-governmental agencies outside of China, as well as private individual donors.

CLW has received funding from the National Endowment for Democracy (NED) and the International Labor Rights Forum. It lost most of its funding after the second Trump administration ordered a halt on most foreign aid in January 2025. It lost further funding after the United States Department of Treasury blocked imbursements to the NED, which forced it to cut funding to CLW. According to information posted by CLW Executive Director Li Qiang on LinkedIn, all U.S. State Department funding to CLW was fully restored after March 3, 2025.

== See also ==
- China Labour Bulletin
- Labor relations in China
