= Jasic Workers Solidarity Group =

Labour solidarity movement in Huizhou, Guangdong, China

The Jasic Workers Solidarity Group (Chinese: 佳士工人声援团) was a student-led labour movement in the city of Huizhou, Guangdong, China, which protested against labour conditions at a factory owned by Jasic Technology, a welding machinery manufacturer, from July to August 2018. The group of students and disgruntled workers sought to legally form a labour union; the dispute came to be known as the Jasic incident. Their efforts were, despite initial signs of support, opposed by the All-China Federation of Trade Unions, which rarely engages in collective bargaining and has been described as 'ineffective at representing workers'. Unions in China are legal only if they are under the ACFTU. Hence, the Federation's opposition constituted a legal excuse for suppression of the JASIC unionists and their student allies. The movement consisted mostly of left wing students of Peking University and has been characterized as Maoist, feminist, and socialist.

== History ==
In January 2018, the initially American-based Me Too movement began to gain popularity within Chinese academic circles. Yue Xin, a student at Peking University, began a campaign against Professor Shen Yang over allegations of rape and sexual misconduct in 1998, which led to the suicide of a female student.

In September 2018, workers at the JASIC factory in Huizhou, Guangdong attempted to form a union in protest to poor labour conditions and inadequate pay. The news of workers' protests spread through Chinese social media, leading to a group of forty students to travel to Huizhou to protest in solidarity with the workers. Members of the group have characterized themselves as Marxists and Maoists.

== Members ==
- Yue Xin: #MeToo activist at Peking University
- Zhang Shengye:
- Chen Kexin
- Zhang Yunfan: Marxist activist
- Liu Penghua: One of four Jasic employees who attempted to form a labour union.
- Li Zhan: Former Jasic employee who supported unionization
- Mi Jiuping: "Worker-Poet" and one of the central union organizers at JASIC.
- Yu Juncong: Jasic employee who supported unionization and the author of the first open letter to Jasic Technology.

== Reactions ==
Cornell University announced that it would no longer be co-operating with Renmin University of China after the crackdown on student activists. Human rights organization Amnesty International released a statement condemning the suppression of the striking workers and the detention of student activists.

== See also ==
- Maoist Communist Party of China
- Me Too movement
- New Left in China
