= Zhi Xian Party =

Banned political party in China

Chinese Constitutionalist Party 中国至宪党 Zhōngguó Zhì Xiàn Dǎng
- Chairman: Bo Xilai (nominal)
- Founder: Wang Zheng
- Founded: 6 November 2013
- Banned: 2 December 2013
- Ideology: Chongqing model; Mao Zedong Thought
- Political position: Left-wing

The Zhi Xian Party, (Note: Chinese: 中国至宪党; pinyin: Zhōngguó Zhì Xiàn Dǎng; lit. 'China Constitution-Foremost Party') also known as the Chinese Constitutionalist Party in English, was an unregistered political party in China. It was founded on 6 November 2013 by citizen activist Wang Zheng who supported the Chinese Communist Party's position as the country's ruling party, but who also seek a return to a Maoist model and an end to what they consider violations of the national constitution by the Communist Party. Bo Xilai was elected the party's "Chairman for Life", because the party considered the trial against him unjust. The party was banned in December 2013.
