= Chinese Chemistry Olympiad =

Chinese Chemistry Olympiad (Chinese: 中国化学奥林匹克竞赛) is an annual academic competition held by Chinese Chemical Society. CAS changed its official Chinese name in February 2014, though its English translation remains the same.

The first CChO was held in 1984, 16 years after IChO. The event has been held every year since then. China has selected excellent high school students to take part in IChO through the competition since 1987.

== Process ==
- Preliminary round: Usually held around the end of August and the beginning of September each year.
- Final round: Usually held around the end of November and the start of December.

(An interesting fact is that before 2011 the final round took part in the next January after the preliminary round, but some reforms were launched and consequently the time was altered to the end of the year in 2011.)

== Difficulty ==
It is considered to be the most difficult Chemistry exam throughout the world, the difficulty of Final round is much harder than IChO. The difficulty of the preliminary round is often enough to surpass IChO, also. Its problems are often beyond the abilities of an overwhelming majority of undergraduates. (As a consequence, IChO problems are regarded as "beginners' exercises" among those Chinese students.)
