= Jasic Technology Co., Ltd. =

Chinese company

Jasic Technology Company Ltd.
- Company type: Public
- Traded as: SSE: 300193.SZ
- Industry: Welding Equipment and Services
- Founded: 2005; 21 years ago, in Shenzhen, Guangdong, People's Republic of China
- Headquarters: Shenzhen, China
- Area served: Worldwide
- Key people: Lei Pan; (Chairman of the Board); Ruyi Xia; (CFO, Financial Director, Deputy General Manager)
- Products: Welding-Related products
- Website: Jasictech.com

Jasic Technology Company Ltd.
- Chinese: 深圳市佳士科技股份有限公司
Transcriptions
Standard Mandarin
- Hanyu Pinyin: Shēnzhènshì Jiāshì Kējì Gǔfènyǒuxiàngōngsī
Yue: Cantonese
- Jyutping: sam1 zan3 si5 gaai1 si6 fo1 gei6 gu2 fan6*2 jau5 haan6 gung1 si1

Jasic Technology Company Ltd. (Chinese: 佳士科技; pinyin: Jiāshì Kējì; Jyutping: gaai1 si6 fo1 gei6) is a Chinese corporation operating out of Shenzhen, in the province of Guangdong. Its headquarters are in Pingshan New District.

The company manufactures and sells inverter welding machines, engine driven welders and other welder equipment primarily used in construction. Jasic is listed on The Shenzhen Stock Exchange.

Jasic was the center of a labor and political conflict in the city of Guangdong, referred to as the Jasic Incident.

== Overview ==
Jasic Technology Company was founded in 2005 in Shenzhen, Guangdong. Jasic presently operates three factories in Shenzhen: Jasic Industrial Park, Chongqing Yunda Industrial Park, and Chengdu Jasic Industrial Park.

== 2018 labour dispute ==
The Jasic Technology Company was at the center of a widely reported controversy regarding the treatment of employees at Jasic Industrial Park in Shenzhen. Workers at the plant cited low pay, long hours, poor working conditions and, in addition, accused the management of Jasic of violating Chinese labor laws through illegal coerced overtime and excessive company fines.

In May 2018 several employees of Jasic petitioned to form a labor union with the All-China In Federation of Trade Unions, which was rejected. The workers decided to continue to build their union independently, workers reported that union organizers were attacked and beaten so after. Tensions sparked on 27 July when twenty nine workers and supporters were arrested and allegedly beaten by Shenzhen Police.

In response to the arrests, at noon on Monday, 6 August a group of eighty demonstrators publicly protested against the detainment outside of the Yanziling police station.

"At noon on Monday, about 80 supporters staged a second rally under the scorching sun outside Yanziling police station in Shenzhen's Pingshan district, about 50 km (31 miles) from the border with Hong Kong. More than 40 Communist Party members and retired cadres, who are part of the country's leading Maoist internet forum, Utopia, joined the rally."

A wide range of public figures condemned Chinese suppression of labor activists including MIT professor Noam Chomsky, Chinese labor activist Li Qiang, University of Hong Kong professor Pun Ngai, Chris Chan King-chi, Jenny Chan, Neo-Hegelian philosopher Slavoj Žižek, American socialist journal Jacobin, Amnesty International, Human Rights Watch, and Cornell University.
