= Dingxin Zhao =

Chinese sociologist (born 1953)

Dingxin Zhao (Chinese: 赵鼎新; born 1953) is a Chinese sociologist and the Max Palevsky Professor Emeritus of Sociology at the University of Chicago. His book, The Power of Tiananmen State-Society Relations and the 1989 Beijing Student Movement, is widely considered the definitive work on the 1989 Tiananmen Square protests and massacre. He is also a former mathematical ecologist, and has doctorates in both entomology and sociology. His areas of specialization include political sociology and the sociology of social movements.
