= Peking University Marxist Society =

Student Association at Peking University, established in 2000

The Peking University Marxist Society (Chinese: 北京大学马克思主义学会) is a student association of Peking University established in 2000. Concerned about the release of the "Report on the Logistics Workers of Peking University", the registration of the society was blocked, and the president was taken away by the police.

== Beliefs ==
As one of the students told The Washington Post, they believe "Once you study Marxism, you know real socialism and China's so-called socialism with Chinese characteristics are two different things. They sell fascism as socialism as a street vendor passes off dog meat as lamb."

One of the activities of the Marxist Society members is weekly journeys to factories on Beijing's outskirts and working on assembly lines.

== Report on the Logistics Workers of Peking University ==
On December 15, 2015, the Marxist Society released the "Report on the Logistics Workers of Peking University" on its WeChat public account, saying that there were some problems in the labor contract of Peking University, such as the lack of labor contracts, unpaid social insurance and overtime work. Concerned people inside and outside the school. On the 16th, Peking University responded on its official WeChat and Sina Weibo platform that only a small number of employees participated in the survey. The Report cannot fully reflect the real situation, but the school has been examining individual issues.

== Suppression ==
As a response to the Jasic incident, in which students from Peking University and other Chinese colleges joined striking workers in Shenzhen, Guangdong to demonstrate against unfair working conditions, Peking University began to exert pressure on the Marxist group. In September 2018, Peking University announced that the Marxist Society would be unable to re-register for the Autumn semester. In November, Peking University announced that it has eradicated one "illegal organization" inside the Marxist Society. On December 28, the head of the organization Qiu Zhanxuan, was allegedly abducted and arrested by members of the Chinese police force while in transit to a celebration of Chairman Mao's birthday.

In 2019, Qiu Zhanxuan was detained again and humiliated. Other students were also missing.

== See also ==
- Chinese Left-wing Youth
