= Pun Ngai =

Hong Kong sociologist

Pun Ngai (Chinese: 潘毅) is a Chair Professor in the Department of Cultural Studies at Lingnan University and professor emeritus in the Department of Sociology at the University of Hong Kong. Her main research area focuses on Chinese labor. In 2005, she won the C. Wright Mills Award for her book Made in China: Women Factory Workers in a Global Workplace, becoming the first Asian scholar to receive this honor since its establishment in 1964.

== Biography ==
Pun Ngai moved from Shantou to Hong Kong in 1979. Her younger brother is Hong Kong Senior Counsel Hectar Pun Hei. She graduated from the Department of History at the Chinese University of Hong Kong in 1992, and later, from the Faculty of Social Sciences at the University of Hong Kong in 1994 with a Master of Philosophy. In 1998, she completed her PhD in Anthropology at the School of Oriental and African Studies, University of London.

On 19 November 1993, a major fire killed 87 at a toy factory in Shenzhen prompted Pun to focus her research on labor issues in China. In 1995, Pun worked in a Shenzhen factory as a laborer for over a year, living and eating alongside female workers. Over the next twenty years of her career, her research continued to focus on topics such as female workers, construction workers, pneumoconiosis, Foxconn workers, and coal miners. In addition to labor issues, Pun's research also involves gender and cultural politics, globalization, and cross-border studies.

In 1996, Pun co-founded a non-profit grassroots organization called the Chinese Working Women’s Network, (Note: Chinese 女工關懷) dedicated to protecting the rights and interests of female workers in mainland China. She served as chairperson, and later, stepped down and work as a volunteer.

In 2005, she won the C. Wright Mills Award for her book Made in China: Women Factory Workers in a Global Workplace, becoming the first Asian scholar to receive this honor since its establishment in 1964.

In 2010, after a series of suicide incidents at Foxconn in Shenzhen, nine scholars, including Pun, jointly published an open letter calling for attention to the issues faced by the new generation of migrant workers. Subsequently, she collaborated with scholars from mainland China and Taiwan to establish a research team comprising scholars from "the three places across the Taiwan Strait." (Note: translated from Chinese 兩岸三地) The entire research process took nearly two years and involved close to 100 participants, with approximately 20 people undercover inside the factories, covering 19 Foxconn factories in mainland China. The research collected 2,409 valid questionnaires, interviewed over 500 workers, and compiled more than 100,000 words of primary data. Several reports were subsequently released, including the Comprehensive Investigation Report on Foxconn from Highschools Across the Taiwan Strait (Note: translated from Chinese 《兩岸三地高校富士康調研總報告》) in October 2010, the Westward Expansion - Investigation Report on Foxconn's Internal Relocation (Note: translated from Chinese 《西進 ─ 富士康遷調研報告》) in May 2011, Foxconn, Have You Changed? (Note: translated from Chinese 《富士康，你改過自新了嗎？》) in April 2012, and the Foxconn Labor Union Investigation Report (Note: translated from Chinese 《富士康工會調研報告》) in May 2013. These reports accused Apple and its contractor Foxconn of being sweatshops, drawing widespread attention internationally.

In the 2018 Jasic incident, Jasic workers protesting against the factory’s illegal and unreasonable management methods were met with violent treatment by the factory and the police. Subsequently, some of the protesters were arrested. On July 29, students from several universities, including Renmin University of China, Peking University, and Nanjing University, initiated a joint petition in support of the Jasic workers and called for more people to join in. On the 30th, the Hong Kong civil group Students and Scholars against Corporate Misbehaviour (SACOM) issued an open letter supporting the Jasic workers, with over one hundred Chinese and foreign scholars signing the petition, including Pun.

== Awards ==
- Made in China: Women Factory Workers in a Global Workplace won the 2005 C. Wright Mills Award. And, its Chinese translation was selected as one of the ten books to win the Hong Kong Bookprize (香港書獎) in 2007.
- Opening a Minor Genre of Resistance in Reform China: Scream, Dream, and Transgression in a Workplace (Note: original text in Chinese, titled 「開創一種抗爭的次文體：工廠里一位女工的尖叫、夢魘和叛離」, translated to English) published in Sociological Studies (1999, Vol. 83, September, pp. 11–22), was selected in April 2003 by the Chinese Academy of Social Sciences as one of the Sociological Studies' top 100 outstanding papers.
- 《大工地上：中國農民工之歌》[On the Construction Site: Songs of Chinese Migrant Workers] (Note: unofficial English translation) was selected as one of the ten books to win the Hong Kong Bookprize in 2010.
