= Mao Zedong Thought Flag =

Maoist website in China

- Website type: Political website
- Available in: Mandarin Chinese
- Founded: 2003
- Area served: People's Republic of China, Worldwide
- Website: www.maoflag.cc
- Current status: Active

The Mao Zedong Thought Flag (Chinese: 毛泽东思想旗帜网; pinyin: máozédōng sīxiǎng qízhì wǎng; lit. 'Mao Zedong Thought Flag Website'), formerly the Mao Zedong Flag (Chinese: 毛泽东旗帜网; pinyin: máozédōng qízhì wǎng; lit. 'Mao Zedong Flag Website'), often short as the Maoflag (Chinese: 毛旗网; pinyin: máoqíwǎng; lit. 'Maoflag Website'), is a Maoist website based in China, which was established by Chinese Old Left and retired Chinese Communist Party (CCP) members. The website was forced to shut down several times.

The website, which runs largely on donations from members, is headquartered in a residential building, and has expressed support for labor movements, including the workers in the Tonghua Iron and Steel Group riot.

== Background ==
China's reform and opening up have been followed by official support for nationalism and the integration of the Internet with the global economy. There was no room for leftist discourse in the online mainstream media due to official censorship, and the marketization and concerted marginalization efforts of liberal and neoliberal intellectuals. The old leftists within the CCP - some of whom are over 90 years old - struggled to reach out to the Internet, making the transition from print media to the Internet medias and gradually making the leftist voice on the Internet more and more vocal. In 2001, the old leftist magazine Pursuit of Truth (Chinese: 《真理的追求》) was suspended because of its opposition to Jiang Zemin's "Three Represents". After realizing that there was little hope to resume the magazine's publication, in 2003, the editor board of the magazine collaborated with about 100 retired officials from within the CCP to found the Mao Zedong Flag website.

In July 2007, the website crossposted a 7,000-word open letter led by the former Development Research Center of the State Council advisor Ma Bin, deploring the shortcomings of the Chinese economic reforms and arguing that "the whole country is at a most precarious time" and the country will soon "have its own Boris Yeltsin", causing the website to be suspended shortly thereafter, although according to Qi Zhiwang, one of the creators, the website was down for "technical reasons". The website later reopened.

After the downfall of Bo Xilai, former CCP Secretary of Chongqing, a number of Chinese leftist websites were suspended again, including the Flag and the Utopia. According to Zhang Xiaojin, an associate dean of international studies at People's University, "the State Council and Beijing Information Offices recently convened a meeting of Internet monitors to discuss tight control of seven websites," among which were "two ultra-left sites, Utopia and Maoflag." In 2014, the website was restored as Mao Zedong Thought Flag website, which was later closed again. In 2017, the website was restored as the Mao Zedong Thought Flag again, and registered in Beijing.

== Analysis ==
Due to the website consistently opposing Chinese economic reform, it has been labelled as a far-left or ultra-left website. South China Morning Post linked the website to the far-left neo-Maoist movement. The Economist described the Utopia and the website as "the online inheritors of an orthodox tradition that traces its origins back to the aftermath of the Tiananmen Square protests in 1989 when party hardliners founded journals extolling the virtues of old-style communism." The New York Times reported that the website posted commentaries like "separated from Mao, the Communist Party has no glory left!"

In 2012, Chinese neoauthoritarian historian Xiao Gongqin claimed in Guancha that the Chinese left might incite social discontent, accusing Chinese authority of their fear about dealing with left websites, including Mao Zedong Flag.

After liberal Yanhuang Chunqiu was closed by the Beijing authority in 2016, Xiao Shu published a commentary in Deutsche Welle criticizing the celebrations of the closure by the Utopia and Mao Zedong Flag, alleging that "Bo Xilai's line without Bo Xilai" and the far-left have taken over the Chinese public opinion.
