= Nanjie =

Nanjie 南街村
- Village
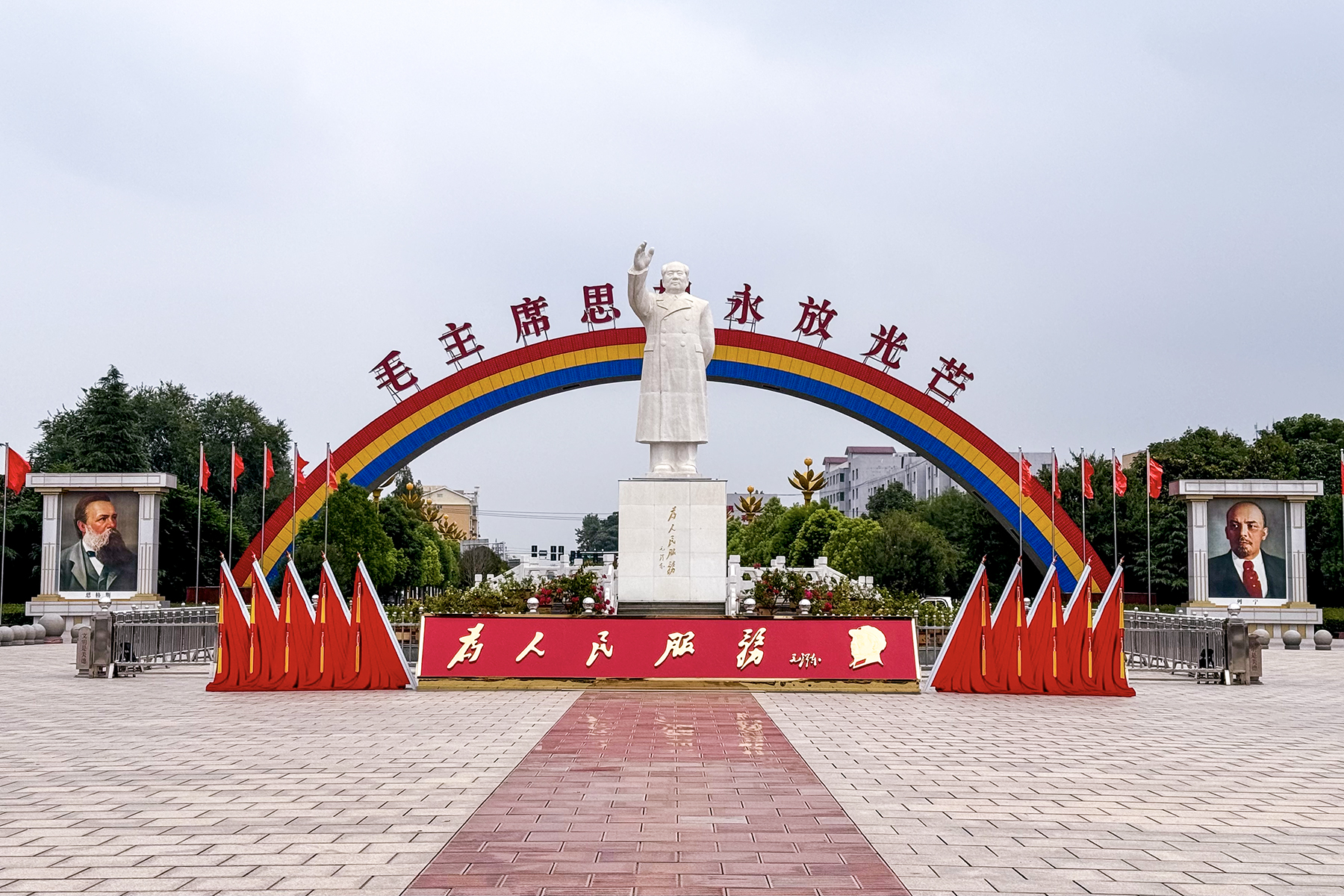
- Statue of Mao Zedong flanked by portraits of Friedrich Engels (left) and Vladimir Lenin (right) in Nanjie

- Location in Henan
- Coordinates: 33°48′09″N 113°57′27″E
- Country: People's Republic of China
- Province: Henan
- Prefecture-level city: Luohe
- County: Linying
- Town: Chengguan

Government
  - Party Committee Secretary: Wang Hongbin (Chinese Communist Party)

Area
  - Total: 1.78 km^{2} (0.69 sq mi)

Population (2011)
  - Total: 3,400
  - Density: 1,900/km^{2} (4,900/sq mi)
- Time zone: UTC+8 (China Standard)
- Postal code: 411122
- Telephone area code: (0)395

Nanjie (Chinese: 南街村; pinyin: Nánjiē Cūn) is a village under the administration of the town of Chengguan, Linying County, Henan. It is widely reported as being the last Maoist village in China, and has attracted considerable global attention due to its unique political and economic system. The village has an area of 1.78 square kilometres (0.69 sq mi), and has about 3,400 permanent residents as of 2011.

== History ==
In 1979, village leader Wang Hongbin, who had been instated two years prior, and his colleagues pooled money to visit a neighbouring county to learn how to start a factory. After the trip, Wang and said colleagues established a flour mill and brick factory in Nanjie. In subsequent years, Wang would frequent Beijing to sell the village's flour and to earn manufacturing contracts. From 1981 to 1984, the village trialed China's household responsibility system, where the village's land and factories were privatized. During the early 1990s, the village began attracting political attention from officials throughout Henan, which enabled it to gain large loans for new projects. Simultaneously, Nanjie began employing workers from outside the village in large numbers.

== Politics ==
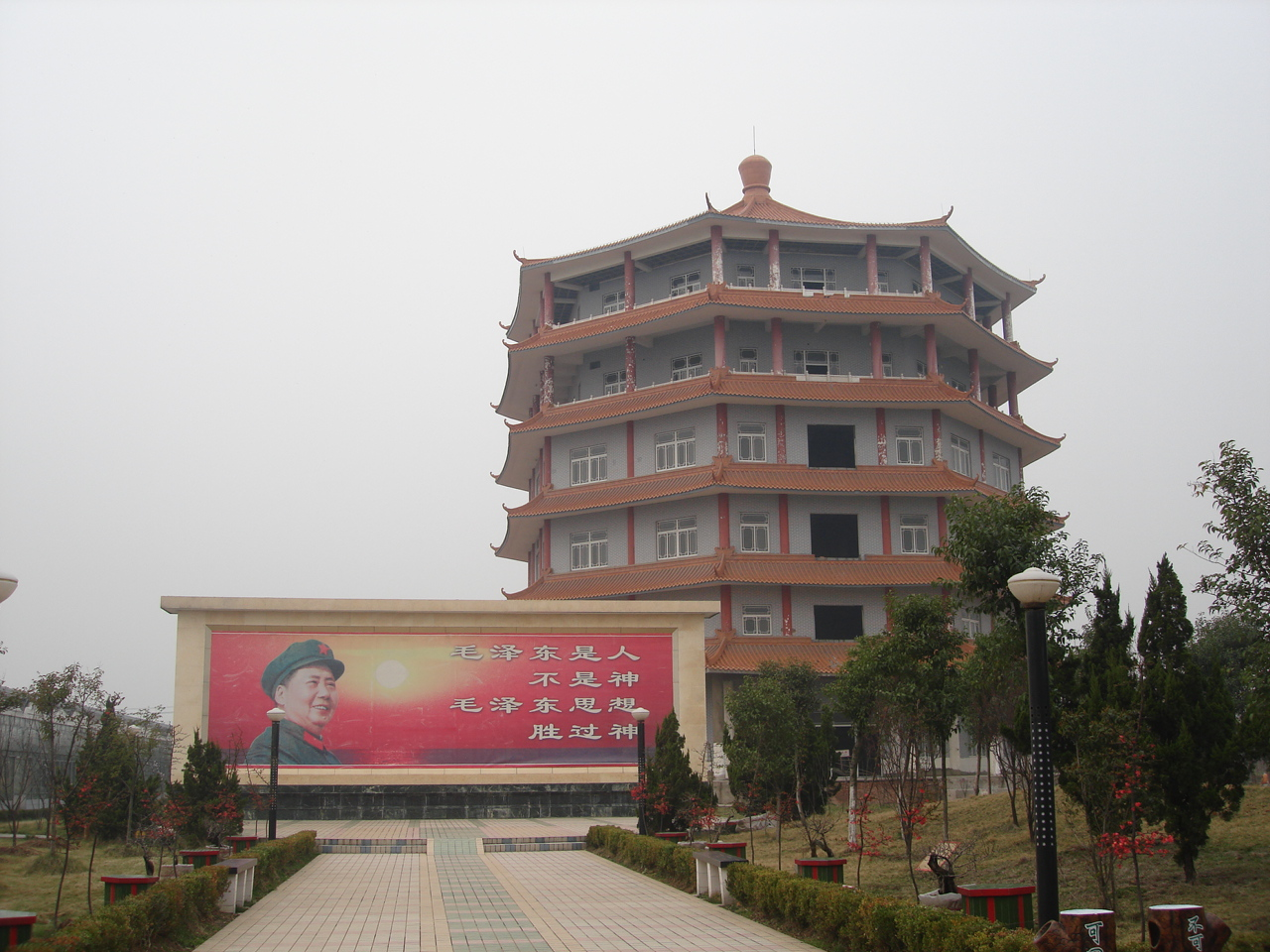
A building and a wall in Nanjie, on which is written "Mao Zedong was a man, not a god, but Mao Zedong Thought is better than the gods". (毛泽东是人不是神，毛泽东思想胜过神)

The village is headed by Wang Hongbin, who has headed the village since 1977. Wang has adopted the title of ban zhang (simplified Chinese: 班长; traditional Chinese: 班長), which translates as "class monitor" or "squad leader", due to it being the lowest title an official can take.

Public portraits and statues of Karl Marx, Friedrich Engels, Vladimir Lenin, Joseph Stalin, and Mao Zedong are common throughout the village, and their images are highly celebrated. Nanjie and many other Maoist villages attract people opposing elements of capitalism, disgruntled old retired party cadres, new left intellectuals, and pro-Maoist protesters.

Judicial punishments in the village include mandatory "study classes" (simplified Chinese: 学习班; traditional Chinese: 學習班; pinyin: xué xí bān), public denunciation, and expulsion from the village. Wang himself underwent public denunciation after investing tens of millions of yuan into a failed "perpetual motion machine" project which shut down in 2011. A 2002 paper also reported that corporal punishment has been used in the village.

== Economy ==
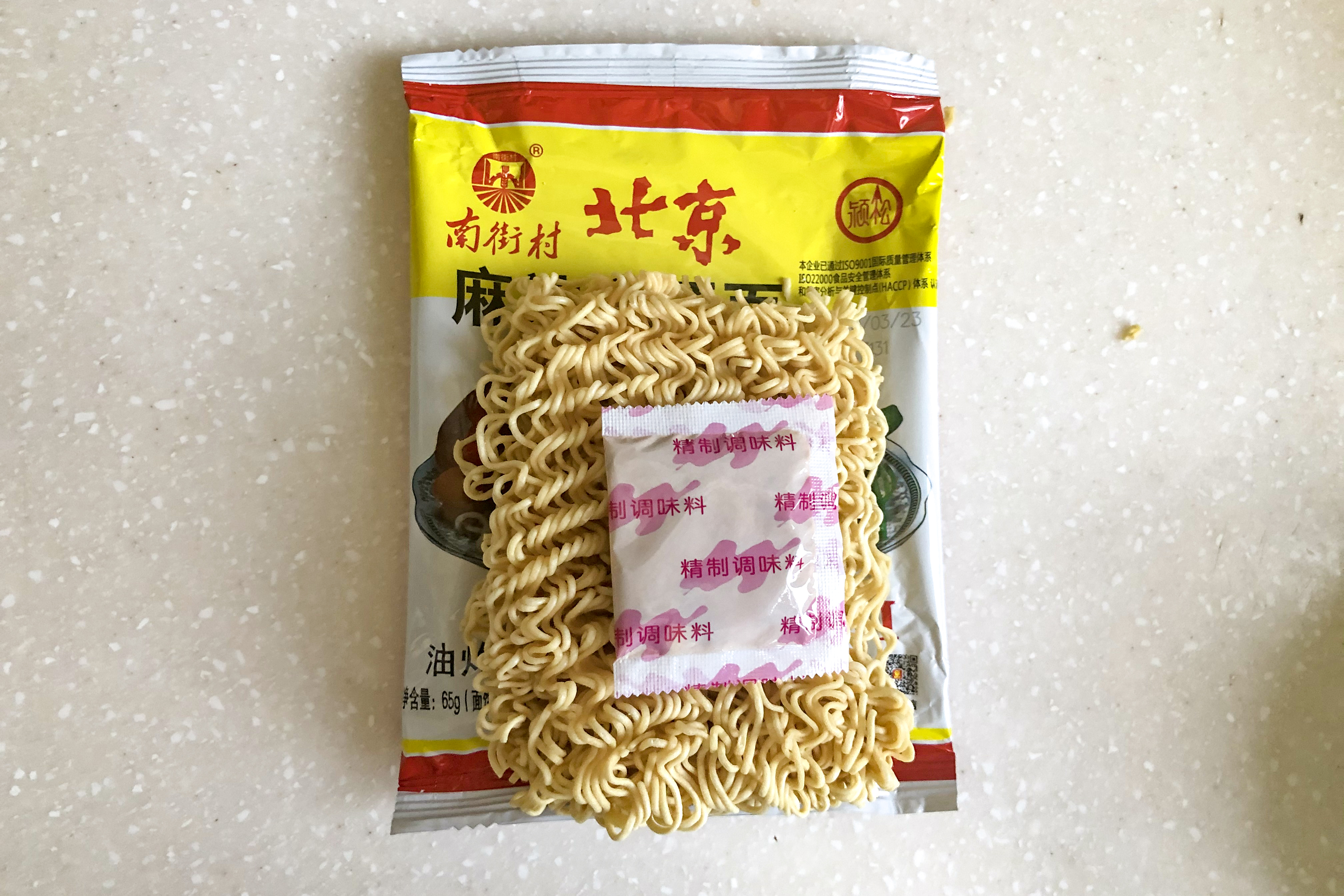
Instant noodles made by Nanjiecun Group, a local enterprise of the village

Nanjie collectivised its agricultural production and industry in 1986, a time when the rest of the country was doing the opposite, introducing market reforms put forward by former leader Deng Xiaoping. This followed a short four-year stint of privatization under China's household responsibility system. The village has inspired a number of other villages in the country to re-collectivise.

The village operates the Nanjie Village Group, which offers all villagers employment in its various workplaces. The group pays village residents 30% of their salary in cash, and puts the remaining 70% of their salary in public services.

By 1990, Nanjie reported a gross domestic product of ¥47.00 million, which rose to over ¥103 million in 1991, ¥212.69 million in 1992, and ¥802.00 million in 1994. Over the next four years, the village's output nearly tripled to ¥1.8 billion. However, from 1998 to 2007, the village saw its gross domestic product fall over 20% down to just over ¥1.4 billion, and by 2007, the village's debt to GDP ratio exceeded 100%.

Nanjie hosts a number of factories and flour mills, and produces a number of foodstuffs, such as instant noodles and beer.

=== Labour ===
The village attracts a large number of commuters from surrounding areas, which represent two or three times the local population. These commuters are not a part of the village's collectivization program, but receive a month salary along with free meals and a dormitory. The village's heavy reliance on those who live elsewhere has drawn criticism from the Southern Metropolis Daily, which ran a piece in 2008 accusing Nanjie's economy of being propped up by cheap labourers who live elsewhere, and through large loans awarded by Communist Party officials.

One migrant labourer reported that migrants work 12-hour days, and are required to attend "political study sessions" after work.

== Tourism ==
The village receives a significant amount of red tourism from visitors throughout China.

== See also ==
- Red tourism
- Huaxi
- Dazhai
- Chinese New Left
- People's commune
