= Tonghua Iron and Steel Group riot =

2009 worker riot in Jilin, China

The Tonghua Iron and Steel Group riot was a riot incident that took place in Tonghua, Jilin, People's Republic of China on July 24, 2009. Angry workers rioted after news of a major company layoff. About 100 people were injured in the clash including a corporate executive who was beaten to death in the event.

== Background ==
News spread that the state-run Tonghua Iron and Steel Group (TISG) was being taken over by the privately owned Beijing Jianlong (建龙) Steel Holdings, formed in 1999 by Zhang Zhixiang (张志祥), an iron and steel merchant from Jiaxing. Jianlong Steel had previously purchased a 36.19% stake in TISG in 2005 during the privatization attempt launched by the Chinese government, and despite not having a majority representation, Jianglong Steel Holdings nonetheless managed to have most of the managerial staff demoted and replaced by managers from Jianglong, under the claim of attempting to improve the performance of TISG.

However, the managerial shake up did not bring improvement as Jianlong had promised, but instead, TISG continued its downward spiral, resulting in most of TISG workers losing their pay, with many of them suffering in the harsh cold of winter when their heat was turned off as they could not afford to pay the heating bills. By the second quarter of 2009, TISG had lost over 11 billion yuan ($159.5 million) since the 2005 Jianlong takeover and its managerial reshuffle. Jianlong Steel responded by selling out all of its shares of TISG, begun to get out completely at the start of 2009, citing that Jianglong could no longer handle the unacceptable loss of TISG, and by March 2009, Jianlong claimed that it was completely out and no longer responsible for TISG.

As the market rebounded, TISG once again begun to make profits, pulling in a profit of 45 million yuan ($6,255,000) in June alone. Witnessing the resurgence of TISG, Jianlong once again asked to purchase shares of TISG in July 2009, merely four months after its complete pullout, and this time it was the controlling share of 65%. The request was approved by provincial officials of Jilin province.

Workers feared that a corporate takeover would lay off 30,000 employees in 3 days. Workers earn a monthly salary of about 300 to 500 yuan ($43.92 to $73.20), compared with 2,500 yuan ($366) per month before Jianlong's first takeover bid.

== Riot ==
Chen Guojun (陈国军), a corporate executive from Jianlong Steel company was paid a salary of 3 million yuan (US$438,000) in 2008, while some retirees received as little as 200 yuan ($29) a month. Since Jianlong's takeover of TISG, workers' salary had not exceeded 1,000 yuan ($145) as the TISG steadily declined, and in the recent financial crisis, workers' salary is further reduced to 500 yuan ($72.5).

After the news, some 30,000 disgruntled steel workers clashed with riot police in protest over a takeover deal. Chen was then beaten to death when he threatened to fire all of former workers of TISG and replace them with new workers.

About 100 people were injured in the incident, and several police cars were destroyed. A Tonghua company spokesman denied 30,000 protested, saying they only have 13,000 people on payroll. Xinhua news agency put the number of protesters at 1,000. Local residents and observers claimed that the 30,000 members included the family members and retired and laid-off workers or employees.

== Aftermath ==
Production and the status quo returned on July 27 at the Tonghua Iron and Steel Group (TISG) after top provincial officials demanded peaceful settlement of the incident, and announced via Tonghua television and radio that Jianlong will never be involved in the reorganization of TISG. The president and chairman of the board of TISG, Mr. An Fengcheng (安凤成), along with several vice presidents have resigned.

Workers of TISG, as well as many local residents have suspected that many corrupted governmental officials were involved in the TISG privatization reorganization plan to embezzle the state asset, while the Jilin provincial officials claimed that the riot was a result of agitators, as claimed by the spokesman and deputy director of the Jilin Provincial National Asset Committee (吉林省国有资产委员会), Mr. Wang Xidong (王喜东) on the emergency news conference held at the 5:00 PM on July 27, 2009.

== See also ==
- June 2009 Shaoguan incident
- Corruption in China
- Protests and dissent in China
- Xiagang
