= China Labour Bulletin =

Non-governmental organization

- 中国劳工通讯
- Abbreviation: CLB
- Formation: 1994; 32 years ago
- Founder: Han Dongfang
- Founded at: Hong Kong
- Dissolved: June 12, 2025; 16 months ago
- Type: non-profit NGO
- Legal status: HK limited company
- Purpose: Worker's rights; documentation of incidents
- Headquarters: Hong Kong
- Official language: Chinese (Mandarin, Simplified); English
- Subsidiaries: FCLB [US 501(c)(3)]
- Website: clb.org.hk

China Labour Bulletin (CLB) was a non-governmental organization that promoted and defended workers' rights in the People's Republic of China. It was based in Hong Kong and was founded in 1994 by labour activist Han Dongfang.

== Overview ==
CLB advocated stronger protection for the rights for Chinese workers, and expressed optimism that their conditions would improve through peaceful and legal action.

CLB supported the development of democratic trade unions in China and the enforcement of the PRC's labour laws. In addition, CLB sought the official recognition in China of international standards and conventions providing for workers' freedom of association and the right to free collective bargaining.

In 2002, CLB established a labour rights litigation programme designed to give workers the chance to seek redress for their grievances through the PRC's court system. The organization provided legal advice for workers and arranged for mainland Chinese lawyers to handle their cases. By October 2007, it had taken on about 140 cases involving such issues as non-payment of wages, industrial injury, and redundancy (unemployment) payments. It also addressed the problem of employment discrimination, in particular, raising awareness of and combating discrimination against the estimated 120 million hepatitis B positive Chinese.

In 2005, CLB set up a programme to promote collective bargaining and the use of factory-wide, legally enforceable collective labour contracts as a means of empowering workers, protecting their legal rights, and enhancing industrial relations.

CLB published five English language and ten Chinese language research reports on a range of issues including the workers' movement in China, migrant workers, child labour, coal mining accidents, and the silicosis epidemic among China's gemstone workers.

In March 2021, CLB documented a series of accidents in the context of workplace safety, which was ignored by the local trade union for allegedly complying to the state's "priorities in eliminating rural poverty and instilling political loyalty".

According to China Labor Bulletin, there were 138 strikes by food delivery drivers between 2015 and 2022. Ten percent of these strikes involved over 100 participants. Nearly all of the food delivery strikes documented by China Labor Bulletin involved Meituan or Ele.me, and the worker's demands primarily related to pay increases or pay arrearages.

On 12 June 2025, China Labor Bulletin announced it would dissolve, citing "financial difficulties and debt issues".

== See also ==
- Labor Contract Law of the People's Republic of China
- China Labor Watch
- Hepatitis B in China
- Hulu Culture
