= Supplier code of conduct =

Intraorganisational standards of procedure

A supplier code of conduct is a statement of the behaviours which an organisation expects of its suppliers and their staff. It may extend to the supply chain and may include commitments on how the organisation will work with its suppliers to build trust and ensure compliance.

The UK government's supplier code of conduct, sponsored by the Government Commercial Function, was introduced to reflect the government's reliance on its suppliers for the delivery of many important public services and to develop "a bond of trust between government, suppliers and the public" operating over an underlying contractual relationship. The code calls for a commitment to respectful treatment and professional and ethical behaviour along with safe, sustainable and fair business practices.

Other examples include:

- ABN Amro, published 2019
- Balfour Beatty, published 2018
- Financial Conduct Authority (UK), published 2019
