= Li Qiang (activist) =

- 李强
- Born: 1972 (age 53–54); Zigong, Sichuan Province
- Occupation: Labor activist
- Organization: China Labor Watch

Li Qiang (Chinese: 李强; pinyin: Lǐ Qiáng; born 1972) is a labor activist who engages in protecting factory workers' rights in China. Li was born in Zigong, Sichuan Province.

== Biography ==
In October 2000, Li founded China Labor Watch, a New York-based independent nonprofit organization. Through investigative reports and frequent press releases on labor news, this group provides the international community with an accurate picture of the labor situation in China and is frequently cited in international media. These investigations are conducted by Li's network of labor activists in China and advised by scholars, lawyers and activists around the world.

In addition to reporting on labor conditions in China, Li has created resources for workers, factory management and international brands. Both CLW and other labor organizations that Li helped to establish provide free legal advising and community training classes to workers in the Pearl River Delta region. These organizations also collaborate with brands to ensure implementation of corporate responsibility standards in corporate supply chains.

In 2004, Li Qiang taught as a visiting scholar at The Center for the Study of Human Rights at Columbia University. In 2009, he has been published in the People's Daily and Nanfeng Chuang, and quoted in a number of international media outlets.

== Publications ==
- Li Qiang 's Column and Commentary

=== Media interview ===
- Bloomberg: The Chinese Labor Activist Who Wants Ivanka Trump to 'Take Responsibility'
- The Wire China: Who's Afraid of Li Qiang?
- The Wall Street Journal : Labor Rights Group Keeps Focus on Worker Abuses
- The New York Times: Questions for Li Qiang of China Labor Watch BY DAVID BARBOZA
