= Utopia (internet forum) =

Maoist Chinese message board (2003-)

- Website type: Forum
- Available in: Mandarin Chinese
- Founded: 2003
- Area served: People's Republic of China, Worldwide
- Website: www.wyzxwk.com
- Advertising: None
- Registration: Optional
- Current status: Active

The Utopia (Chinese: 乌有之乡; pinyin: Wūyǒu Zhī Xiāng) is a Chinese internet forum noted for its strong support of Maoist and communist ideology. The forum is notable for its promotion of Maoist philosophy and for its occasional clashes with the Chinese Communist Party.

== History ==
Utopia was founded in 2003 by Fan Jinggang, who owned a bookstore (also named Utopia, 乌有之乡) in Beijing, China. The forum was created with the stated intent to be “a patriotic website for the public interest", and soon acquired a political lean towards Maoism. In addition to online activities, Utopia also has organized offline events and campaigns.

In 2011, Utopia organized a campaign against Chinese writer Mao Yushi and historian Xin Zilin who wrote and published critical histories of Mao Zedong. The campaign involved organizing of a petition of 40,000 signatures, including those of Liu Siqi (the widow of one of Mao's sons), former vice-minister Ma Bin, and Peking University professor Kong Qingdong.

In April 2012, following the arrest and prosecution of Chinese politician Bo Xilai, Utopia along with several other leftist Chinese websites was temporarily shut down.

In 2013 the forum supported Bo Xilai during the Wang Lijun incident in which Bo and a number of other Chinese politicians were investigated under suspicion of corruption. Utopia continued to support Bo Xilai when the Maoist was removed from his position as Communist Party Secretary of Chongqing, after which the forum was shut down for several months. However, Utopia continued to announce its support for Bo.

Utopia played a prominent role in the Jasic incident of 2018, in which striking workers, student activist and neo-Maoists protested poor working conditions of the Jasic Technology Co., Ltd. factory in Shenzhen, Guangdong. The website was used as a platform to organize supporters of the Jasic workers.

Utopia was suspended for one month in response to its advocacy of a "new" Cultural Revolution.

== See also ==
- Chinese New Left
