= Photon Media =

光傳媒 Photon Media
- Type: Online news media
- Editor-in-chief: Shirley Leung
- Founded: April 2023
- Language: Chinese
- Headquarters: Taiwan
- Website: photonmedia.net

Photon Media is a news website reporting on Hong Kong news abroad. Founded in April 2023 by former Hong Kong journalists including Shirley Leung from Apple Daily. Photon Media is based in Taiwan. The advisory team includes Mark Clifford, former editor-in-chief of the South China Morning Post; journalist Ching Cheong; Yi-zheng Joseph Lian, former director of HK Stand News and Josh Rogin from the Washington Post. In August 2025, Shirley Leung and Edward Li announced that Photon Media and the UK-basked Chaser News would merge into the online news outlet Pulse HK.
