= Democracy in China =

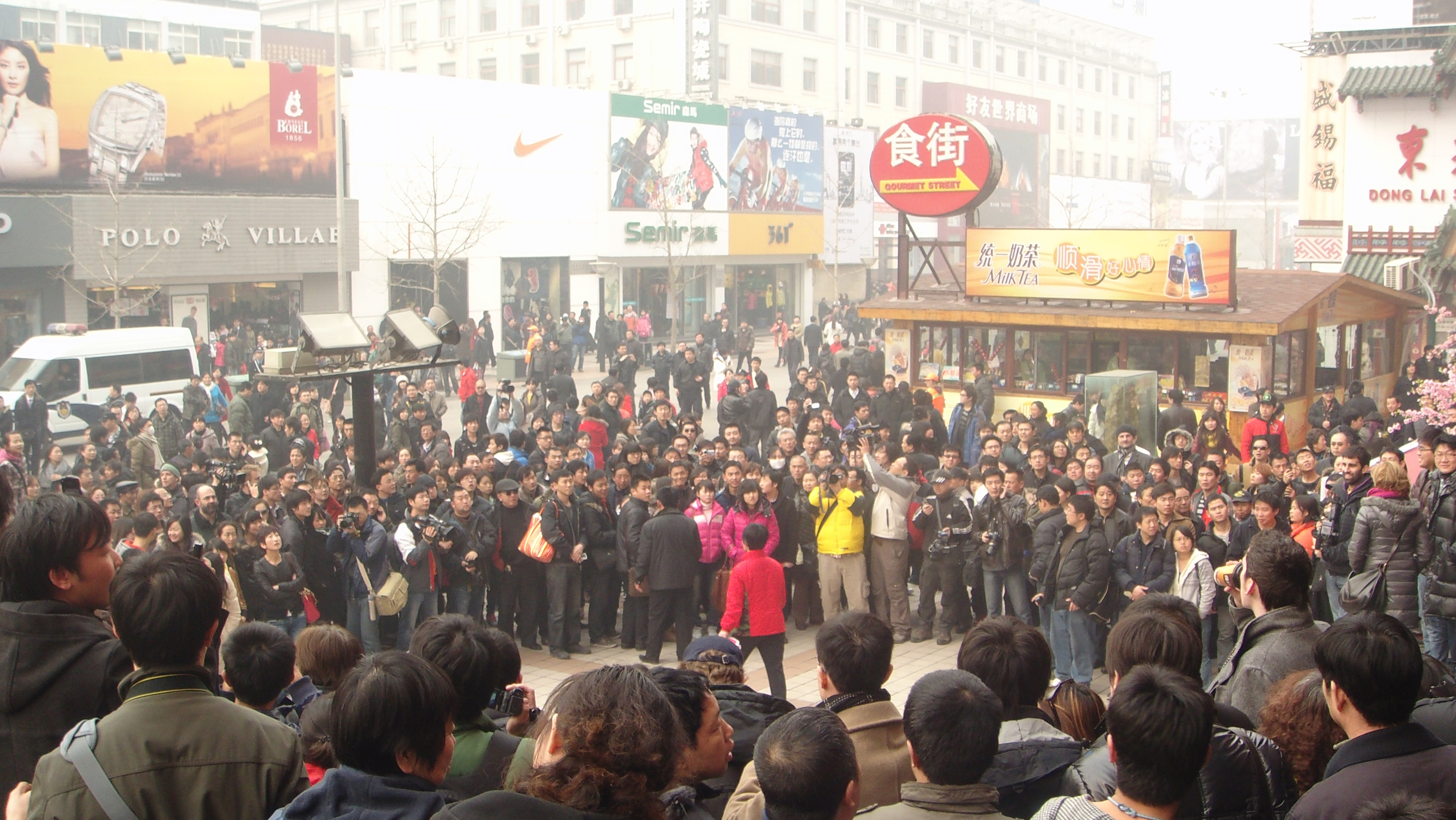
A large crowd of protesters, journalists, police and spectators gathered in front of a McDonald's restaurant in Wangfujing, Beijing as part of the 2011 Chinese pro-democracy protests.

Debate over democracy in China has existed in Chinese politics since the 19th century. The state constitution and CCP constitution of the People's Republic of China both state that the PRC's form of government is "people's democratic dictatorship". Under Xi Jinping's general secretaryship, China is also termed a "whole-process people's democracy." The PRC is not a democracy but a one-party state led by the Chinese Communist Party (CCP). The constitution holds that China is a one-party state that is governed by the CCP. This gives the CCP a monopoly of political power. (Note: Attributed to multiple references:) All political opposition is illegal. Currently, there are eight minor political parties in China other than the CCP that are legal, but all have to accept CCP primacy to exist. China has been characterized as a dictatorship. Freedom of speech and freedom of assembly are severely restricted by the government. Censorship in China is widespread and dissent is harshly punished in the country. Democracy movements in China have been repressed, most notably in the 1989 Tiananmen Square massacre.

Chinese scholars, thinkers, and policy-makers have debated about democracy, an idea which was first imported by Western colonial powers but which some argue also has connections to classic Chinese thinking. Starting in the mid-eighteenth century, many Chinese argued about how to deal with Western culture. Though Chinese Confucians were initially opposed to Western modes of thinking, it became clear that aspects of the West were appealing. Industrialization gave the West an economic and military advantage. The Qing dynasty's defeats in the Opium Wars compelled a segment of Chinese politicians and intellectuals to rethink their notion of cultural and political superiority.

Democracy entered the Chinese consciousness because it was the form of government used in the West, potentially responsible for its industrial, economic and military advancements. A segment of Chinese scholars and politicians became persuaded that democratization and industrialization were imperative for a competitive China. In response, a number of scholars resisted the idea, saying democracy and Westernization had no place in traditional Chinese culture. Liang Shuming's opinion was most popular, holding that democracy and traditional Chinese society were completely incompatible, hence China's only choice was either wholesale Westernization or complete rejection of the West. The debate centered on the philosophical compatibility of traditional Chinese Confucian beliefs and the technologies of the West.

== Qing dynasty ==
Ideas about democracy have been a significant aspect of Chinese intellectual discourse since the mid-nineteenth century.

Introducing the concept of modern democracy is credited to Liang Qichao, a prominent writer and political thinker. In 1898, along with his mentor Kang Youwei, he submitted reform proposals to the young emperor, leading to the Hundred Days' Reforms. These proposed popular participation and elections, but provoked a crackdown from court conservatives and the beheading of several reform advocates. After escaping to Japan, Liang Qichao translated and commented on the works of Hobbes, Rousseau, Locke, Hume, Bentham and many other western political philosophers. He published his essays in a series of journals that found a warm audience among Chinese intelligentsia hungering for an explanation of why China, once a formidable empire, was now on the verge of being dismembered by foreign powers. In interpreting Western democracy through the prism of his strongly Confucian background, Liang shaped the ideas of democracy that would be used throughout the next century. Liang favored gradual reform to turn China into a constitutional monarchy with democracy.

Liang's great rival was Sun Yat-sen who argued that democracy would be impossible as long as the Qing monarchy still existed. Sun proposed the Three Principles of the People (三民主義) – typically translated into English as "Nationalism, Democracy, and People's Livelihood". This framing of democracy (minquanzhuyi) differs from the typical Western view, being based in Liang's interpretation of General will, which prioritizes the power of the group over individual freedoms. Sun viewed traditional Chinese society as too individualistic and stated that individual liberty must be broken down so that the Chinese people could pressed together, using the metaphor of adding cement to sand.

The Boxer Rebellion and the Eight-Nation Alliance invasion exposed the need for basic changes. The Qing Imperial Court responded by organizing elections. China's first modern elections were organized by Yuan Shikai for Tianjin's county council in 1907. In 1909, 21 of 22 provinces, with the exception being Xinjiang, held elections for provincial assemblies and municipal councils. Requirements were strict; only those that passed the imperial exams, worked in government or military, or owned 5000 yuan of property may vote or run for office. This essentially limited the electorate to the gentry class. Hundreds of thousands voted and the winners were overwhelmingly constitutional monarchists, followers of Liang Qichao. The provincial assemblies elected half of the 200 member national assembly, the other half was selected by regent Prince Chun. All of these assemblies became hotbeds of dissent against the Qing as they were protected by freedom of speech. In 1909, the Qing government held parliamentary elections.

== Republic of China ==
After the 1911 Revolution provincial assemblies provided legitimacy to the rebels by declaring their independence from the Qing Empire. The national assembly issued an ultimatum to the Qing court and delegates from the provincial assemblies were sent to Nanjing to legitimize the provisional government of the Republic of China. The 1912 Republic of China National Assembly elections were held with an enlarged electorate, albeit still small proportionally to the national population. The Kuomintang party had the most seats in both houses of the National Assembly (Beiyang government). Song Jiaoren, the incoming Nationalist prime minister, was assassinated in March 1913 before the assembly could meet. The military leader Yuan Shikai forced the National Assembly to elect him president for a five-year term then purged it of Nationalists. After Yuan's death in 1916, a succession of governments failed to unify the country or gain international support. President Xu Shichang organized elections for a third assembly in 1921, but with only 11 provinces voting it never had a quorum and never convened. That was the last attempt to hold national elections until 1947. All assemblies were dissolved after the Nationalists' Northern Expedition.

During the Beiyang period (1912–1928), China's disunity resulted in varied political experiments in different regions. Some regions experimented with aspects of democracy, including different mechanisms for election of city and provincial council elections. Hunan province, for example, established a constitution, universal suffrage, and some levels of council elected by popular vote. These experiments with partial democracy were not long-lasting.

Participants in the May Fourth Movement of 1919 advocated that the development of democracy (nicknamed, "Mr. Democracy") along with science ("Mr. Science") could save China.

During the 1920s, a common position among Chinese intellectuals from a broad range of cultural and ideological positions was that the people were not ready for democracy. Conservative intellectuals viewed the masses as too dangerous to participate in the political process. They believed that China's modernization should rely on educated elites and that it would be a lengthy period before the masses were ready to participate in democracy. Many progressive intellectuals also lacked confidence in the masses. For example, many May Fourth Movement iconoclasts blamed the masses for their passivity in the face of the country's difficult circumstances.

Discourse on social democracy began among Chinese intellectuals during the ROC period.

Sun's 1924 program called for nation-building in three stages: military government, political tutelage, and constitutional government. Sun's view was that military government should be exercised during China's revolutionary period, then as a province stabilized political tutelage could begin and the people educated on self-governance, and finally once all counties in a province were ready to exercise self-governance, constitutional government could begin.

The formation of the Nationalist one-party state in 1927 implemented sought to implement the "political tutelage" stage of Sun Yat-sen's three-stage program, with elections only after the people were properly educated. Over time, portions of the KMT and various public intellectuals urged Chiang Kai-shek to move to the third phase (constitutional government), but Chiang's view was that China remained in a revolutionary period and continued to need the KMT's political tutelage.

In 1932, Chiang created the Blue Shirts Society, the core of which were KMT military officers who had been exposed to the politics of fascism through Chiang's Nazi advisors. Blue Shirts rhetoric emphasized contempt for liberal democracy.

In an effort to improve the KMT's disintegrating support during the late phase of the Chinese Civil War, in 1947 Chiang sought to allow some democracy and officially declared the third phase of the KMT's program. The KMT initially allowed direct election of the National Assembly and for non-KMT parties to compete in the election.

After the end of the Second Sino-Japanese War, the Nationalist government promulgated the Constitution of the Republic of China. The 1947 National Assembly and 1948 legislative elections were boycotted by the CCP. As a result, the Nationalists and their junior coalition partners, the Chinese Youth Party and China Democratic Socialist Party, won the election.

== People's Republic of China ==
The People's Republic of China (PRC) officially refers to itself as a "socialist democracy with Chinese characteristics", but explicitly distinguishing itself from a liberal democratic system, which the CCP calls "unfit" for China's conditions. In the PRC definition, democracy has meant the Marxist–Leninist concepts of people's democratic dictatorship and democratic centralism. According to this viewpoint, the CCP acts as the representative of the Chinese public.

=== Early Chinese Communist Party views ===
At the 1929 Gutian Congress, the CCP addressed questions related to the politics of the Chinese Red Army. A resolution that followed the conference stated that the Red Army must be organized under the principle of democratic centralism. In the article The Democratic Movement within the Army, written during the Second Sino-Japanese War, Mao Zedong discussed the Red Army's political work and stated, "Through the democratic movement under centralized leadership, we were able to achieve a high degree of political unity, improve lives, and improve military technology and tactics, which are our three main purposes." This view of democracy in the military emphasized democratic centralism and avoiding what the CCP deemed "extreme democracy[,] or anarchism."

Mao put forward the concept of New Democracy in his early 1940 text On New Democracy, written while the Yan'an Soviet was developing and expanding during the Second Sino-Japanese War. During this period, Mao was concerned about bureaucratization and sought to develop a culture of mass politics. In his view, mass democracy was crucial, but could be guaranteed only to the revolutionary classes. In the concept of New Democracy, the working class and the communist party are the dominant part of a coalition which includes progressive intellectuals and bourgeois patriotic democrats.This coalition of classes is symbolized by the four smaller stars on the flag of China: workers, peasants, intellectuals, and the national bourgeoisie. Led by a communist party, a New Democracy allows for limited development of national capitalism as part of the effort to replace foreign imperialism and domestic feudalism.

=== Mao era ===
The Chinese People's Political Consultative Conference (CPPCC) was the primary government body through which the CCP sought to incorporate non-CCP elements into the political system pursuant to principles of New Democracy. On September 29, 1949, the CPPCC unanimously adopted the Common Program as the basic political program for the country following the success of the Chinese Communist Revolution. The Common Program defined China as a new democratic country which would practice a people's democratic dictatorship led by the proletariat and based on an alliance of workers and peasants which would unite all of China's democratic classes (defined as those opposing imperialism, feudalism, and bureaucratic capitalism and favoring an independent China).

The Hungarian Revolution of 1956 and its suppression prompted debated within the CCP and among non-institutional actors like students and cultural workers. The CCP viewed the events of the revolution in context of its concern with the Soviet de-Stalinization of 1956 and the sort of problems along the lines of the Eastern European uprisings that China might eventually have to face. A group that included Liu Shaoqi, major figures in the press, and the membership of the democratic parties, contended that the three risks of "subjectivism, sectarianism, and bureaucratism" should be opposed through a process of Great Democracy that increased the people's participation in party-state institutions. Mao expressed a view of "Big Democracy" in which the people would check institutions not through being incorporated into them, but through acting against them through popular protest, strikes, and agitation.

During the Cultural Revolution, Grand Democracy was expressed through the "four great freedoms" of speaking out freely, airing views fully, writing big-character posters, and engaging in big debates. The Cultural Revolution promoted political empowerment of ordinary Chinese people, according to academic Dongping Han. Prior to the Cultural Revolution, rural production team leaders were appointed by village leaders (who had themselves been appointed by commune leaders). In his fieldwork in Jimo, academic Dongping Han found that production team leaders during the Cultural Revolution were elected by team members to one year terms as part of what Han describes as a rising democratic consciousness among ordinary people. In her analysis, academic Liu Yu distinguishes the concepts of "liberal" and "democracy," which she views as too often tied together. Liu's view is that during the Cultural Revolution, China was "extremely democratic" while also being "extremely illiberal".

=== Reform and opening up ===
Ideas about democracy have been a major topic for intellectual debate since the beginning of the post-Mao era.

In the Democracy Wall movement of 1978 to 1979, movement participants argued that democracy was the means to resolve conflict between the bureaucratic class and the people, although the nature of the proposed democratic institutions was a major source of disagreement among participants. A majority viewed the movement as part of a struggle between correct and incorrect notions of Marxism. Many participants advocated classical Marxist views that drew on the Paris Commune for inspiration. The Democracy Wall movement also included non-Marxists and anti-Marxists, although these participants were a minority.

Leaders of the post-Mao reforms in the 1980s argued that the CCP's record under Mao was bad, but that the CCP reformed without being forced. The American political scientist Andrew Nathan concluded that "the reforms aimed to change China from a terror-based, totalitarian dictatorship to a 'mature,' administered dictatorship of the Post-Stalinist Soviet or Eastern European type." "Democracy" would not involve elections or participation in decision making but "the rule of law", which was based on procedural regularity in the exercise of power.

Social democracy lost its political taboo in China in the 1980s. Chinese academic research and think-tank research on social democracy began in the middle of that decade.

The Soviet experience of perestroika was interpreted by the CCP as a form of social democratic reform, with the dissolution of the Soviet Union resulting in the belief among CCP leadership that social democracy should be avoided. A common view in China interprets the Russian experience of democratization as a warning that it leads to territorial fragmentation, political and social instability, and economic losses.

=== 21st century ===
The CCP continues to operate on the Leninist principle of democratic centralism. From 2007 to 2009, then-General Secretary of the Chinese Communist Party Hu Jintao promoted intra-party democracy (dangnei minzhu, 党内民主) in an effort to decrease the party's focus on top-down decision-making. Chinese premier Wen Jiabao called for more democracy in 2011, having generally been regarded as a political reformer during his career. However, Wu Bangguo, chairman of the Standing Committee of the National People's Congress, said in 2011 that "we have made a solemn declaration that we will not employ a system of multiple parties holding office in rotation", having said similar remarks during his career. In December 2008, more than 350 intellectual and cultural leaders, including Liu Xiaobo, issued Charter 08. The Charter said China remains the only large world power to still retain an authoritarian system that so infringes on human rights, and "This situation must change! Political democratic reforms cannot be delayed any longer!"

The CCP's Core Socialist Values campaign introduced during its 18th National Congress in 2012, which lists democracy as one of its four national values. After Xi Jinping became CCP general secretary in 2012, Amnesty International said that human rights in China have become worse. Outside assessments of human rights abuses are rejected by the government.

In 2013, a CCP memo called Document Number 9 was leaked, in which Xi warned in 2012 against "Western constitutional democracy" along with other ideas such as universal values. Throughout his tenure, Xi has strengthened the CCP's control over the government. In the first session of the 13th National People's Congress in 2018, term limits for the presidency were also abolished.

According to Xi's view of democracy, China "must not blindly copy the development models of other countries nor accept their dictation. The state system which is a socialist state under the people's democratic dictatorship led by the working class ... is under the leadership of the CPC ... and the principle of democratic centralism". During a visit to Europe in 2014, Xi Jinping said that a multi-party system would not work for China. He said China had experimented in the past with various political systems, including multi-party democracy, warning that copying foreign political or development models could be catastrophic because of its unique historical and social conditions.

According to Xi, Chinese history after the fall of the Qing dynasty demonstrates that Western political systems do not fit China's national circumstances. Xi stated that "China had experimented with constitutional monarchy, imperial restoration, parliamentary politics, multi-partisan arrangement, presidential system, and others. All diverse political forces came unto the historical stage but none of them had successfully offered 'a correct answer' to the question of national salvation."

==== Whole-process people's democracy ====
In 2019, Xi coined the term "whole-process people's democracy," which he said "put the people are the masters of their own country" and that in it "all major legislative decisions are made only after democratic deliberations and thorough procedures to ensure sound and democratic decision-making". He said that "whole-process democracy" had four pillars:

1. process democracy (过程民主) and achievement democracy (成果民主)
2. procedural democracy (程序民主) and substantive democracy (实质民主)
3. direct democracy (直接民主) and indirect democracy (间接民主)
4. people's democracy (人民民主) and will of the state (国家意志)

Under the concept of whole-process people's democracy, whether a country is democratic should not be measured by the electoral process but instead by the results it delivers to the people. By using the improvement of living standards and development as the measure of democratic success, this framing favors China, which has undergone major advances in development and living standards during the last four decades.

In 2021, in response to the Summit for Democracy held by US president Joe Biden, the State Council released a white paper called China: Democracy That Works which praised China's "whole-process democracy", said that "there are many ways to achieve democracy" and disparaged American democracy as "performative."

==== Consultative democracy ====
The general secretaryship of Xi Jinping promotes a view of consultative democracy (xieshang minzhu 协商民主) rather than intra-party democracy. This view of socialist democracy emphasizes consulting more often with society at large while strengthening the leading role of the party. Through consultative democracy, Chinese policymakers seek to balance conflicting interests and stakeholders as long as they do not challenge the CCP priorities, with the main channel for this being the Chinese People's Political Consultative Conference (CPPCC). The CPPCC is an institutional component of the CCP's people's democracy and united front strategy, which provides a "seat" for the eight small legally-permitted parties and independent nonparty "friends." These eight parties were founded before the proclamation of the PRC, and they must accept the "leading role" of the CCP as a condition of their continued existence. Such institutional mechanisms for addressing the interests of new elites while also taking into account disadvantaged groups have been described by academics as "administrative absorption of society" or "democracy in governance."

=== Contemporary views ===
Chinese policymakers generally view liberal democratic political systems as hampered in their ability to pursue long-term development targets and long-term programs because of their focus on election campaigns and the frequent changes of government in such systems. In this view, policy under liberal democratic systems as largely restricted to ad hoc interventions which leaves social development vulnerable to blind market forces and the short-term policy interventions available under democratic systems are not equipped to address long-term issues such as environmental degradation, dysfunction in capital markets, or population change.

Chinese policymakers generally view the experience of the post-Soviet states as an example of the harm caused by rapid democratization. According to this view, these states' adoption of liberal democracy resulted in the collapse of their communist governments and a decade of political instability and economic instability. The election of Donald Trump as President of the United States reinforced Chinese views that liberal democracy is dysfunctional. The United States' response to the COVID-19 pandemic compounded the situation, increasing views among the Chinese public that the United States political system and economy were not world benchmarks. The re-election of Donald Trump likewise reinforced this perception for many Chinese.

Contending that the U.S. has increasingly adopted a "cold war mentality," foreign policy discourse by Xi Jinping-era officials and media have increasingly depicted global politics as a contest between two different views of democracy. This view deems the U.S. as excessively focused on the internal governance of other countries and creating divisions with countries like China and Russia. This Chinese discourse contends that, in contrast to the U.S. view of internal democracy, China seeks to democratize international relations by creating opportunities for non-Western countries to have an increased influence on international affairs.

Chinese "good governance" (shanzhi 善治) advocates contend that China should implement "incremental democracy" focused on orderly expansion of citizen participation in politics and reforming governance. In their view, the one-party state approach of Singapore is an important model from which China should draw inspiration.

Intellectual debates regarding social democracy after 2007, when Xie Tao published the article Only Social Democracy Can Save China in the liberal journal Yanhuang Chunqiu. Chinese proponents of social democracy often cite the Swedish Social Democratic Party as a model, contending that it is responsible for building a largely egalitarian country with adequate welfare and protection for the rights of workers and farmers.

The perspective of the Chinese New Left rejects the idea of Western-style democracy, contending that competitive elections are either harmful or irrelevant to its conception of democracy. In the New Left view, liberal democracy is an undesirable departure from the democratic concept of direct self-rule by the people. New Leftists also cite perceived declines in election turnouts and loss of confidence in results as further weaknesses of the Western system. The general belief on the New Left is that China's historical conditions, including its experiences with drastic economic and political changes over the course of the 20th century, means that it cannot adopt Western democracy.

==== Academic views ====
Wang Shaoguang writes that democracy has many meanings, but the most important is "a government's responsiveness to the people, meaning government policies reflect popular needs, demands, [and] preferences to a high degree; this kind of democracy is the closest to the true meaning of democracy." According to his view, representative democracy amounts to choosing one's master and does not necessarily improve the lives of most people in the country.

Wang Hui writes that while many consider China undemocratic, "during the 1950s, 1960s, and 1970s, there existed within the party a self-correction mechanism. Theoretical debate, particularly open theoretical debate, played an important role in the course of the party's and the state's self-adjustment and self-reform."

Cui Zhiyuan writes that Mao's concept of Great Democracy is valuable to contemporary China. Cui believes the Mao view of "righteous rebellion" should be institutionalised as a mean for the masses to express their criticisms.

In his criticism of Western liberal democracy, academic Zhang Weiwei, promotes the idea of Chinese socialist democracy, which he describes as a combination of "selective democracy" and electoral democracy. Zhang's view is that Chinese socialist democracy outperforms "Western procedural democracy" because the Western approach is insufficient to choose trustworthy leaders and the Chinese approach is more meritocratic. Zhang also points to China's long-term stability and economic growth as further evidence of what he believes is the superiority of its system.

Confucian intellectual Jiang Qing contends that democracies tend to destroy the environment and exploit other countries and that a Western-style democracy would not be suitable for China. According to Jiang, "democratic electorates give rise to imperialism, fascism, and hegemonism." Jiang is a leading proponent of the idea that China should discard the idea of democracy entirely and develop a "kingly way" of governance grounded in Confucian principles.

Publishing in 2025, academic He Li states that online intellectual debate in China on the topic of democracy is "thriving."

=== Elections ===
The People's Republic of China conducts direct and indirect elections for its people's congresses, a practice that began in CCP-controlled areas during the Chinese Civil War. The operation of people's congresses were set out in the Electoral Law of 1953 and have been subsequently revised. Currently there are five levels of people's congresses. From more to less local, they are: (1) people's congresses in villages, minority nationality townships, and towns; (2) people's congresses of cities that are not sub-divided, municipal districts, counties, and autonomous counties; (3) people's congresses in sub-districts of larger cities and in autonomous prefectures; (4) people's congresses in provinces, autonomous regions, and municipalities directly administered by China's central government; and (5) the National People's Congress. Direct elections occur at the two most local levels, while the members at the higher levels are indirectly elected, i.e., elected by those elected in the lower levels. The National People's Congress is officially China's supreme organ of state power. However, nominations at all levels are controlled by the CCP, and CCP's leading position is enshrined in the state constitution, meaning that the elections have little way of influencing politics. Additionally, elections are not pluralistic as no opposition to the CCP is allowed.

Starting in the 1980s, in the reform and opening up period, the government organized village elections in which several candidates would run, changing the position of the village chairman from appointed by the CCP to being elected by villagers. In mid-2000s the autonomy of elected village officials gradually eroded. The expansion of direct elections has been opposed by the CCP.

=== Special Administrative Regions, 1997–present ===
As European colonies, Hong Kong and Macau were denied democratic governments until very late in the colonial period. Official memos from CCP leaders, threatening the British government if they were to hold elections in Hong Kong, were repeatedly sent from the 1950s onwards.

==== Hong Kong ====
Many dissenting political groups and political parties have reportedly chosen to disband under pressure from Beijing. In April 2025, Hong Kong's biggest pro-democracy party, the Democratic Party, voted to give its leadership the mandate to move toward a potential disbandment. Two veteran members stated that the League of Social Democrats began its dissolution process after receiving warnings from Chinese officials that the party must disband or face consequences ahead of upcoming elections. A Chinese official also warned a former lawmaker that "the party should not remain until the end of this year." In June 2025, the League of Social Democrats, one of Hong Kong's last pro-democracy parties, disbanded under political pressure.

== Citizen surveys ==
According to the 2018 World Values Survey, Chinese people approve of democracy (83% of respondents) over strong leader rule (54%), military rule (53%), expert rule (52%), and religious rule (24%). Eighty-five percent of Chinese surveyed also agreed that it is very important to live in a democratic country. Academic Wenfang Tang's 2024 study of multi-year World Values Survey data from China concludes that there is a strong desire for, and high level of satisfaction with, freedom, democracy, and human rights among the Chinese public. Older groups tend to be more satisfied with democracy and China's political system than do younger groups. Groups with higher education tended to view democracy as more important and also tended to be more satisfied with the China's political system. Other groups that tended to be more satisfied with democracy and with China's political system include rural people, ethnic minorities, and people who practice religion. World Values Survey respondents in China generally conclude that political rights and economic rights are equally important to the concept of democracy. Tang's study also concludes that the Chinese public views China's political system as democratic because they view it as satisfying people's political rights and concepts of social justice.

An Asian Barometer Survey from 2014 to 2016 had 76% of Chinese respondents agreeing that democracy was capable of solving the problems in their society. When asked to rate the level of democracy in their government on a 10-point scale, they gave an overall rating of 6.5 (the 7th highest percentage out of 14 different regions surveyed). Zhengxu Wang of Fudan University in Shanghai wrote in a report in 2007: "It is clear that public support for democracy is high in China. Public opinion surveys show that more than 90% of Chinese citizens believe that having a democracy is good. But the majority is not yet ready for a major effort towards democratization because they still see economic growth and social stability as more important than freedom of speech, political participation, and other democratic rights." Analyzing Asia Barometer survey data, academic Yun-han Chu states that "there is a widely shared belief among ordinary Chinese people that 'democracy' means government for the people rather than government by the people."

The Democracy Perception Index, a survey conducted by the Dalia Research Group and the Alliance of Democracies, analyzes the democratic deficit (which it defines as the gap between people's expectations of democracy and how they rate democracy in their country). As of 2020, China is one of the countries with the smallest democratic deficits. In 2022, a poll by the Alliance of Democracies Foundation found that 91% of Chinese say democracy is important to them, with 81% saying that China is a democracy.

According to Chinese economist David Daokui Li, the general trend is that age cohorts born in the 1970s and later take a more critical view of United States-style democracy than other age cohorts. In their analysis of survey data on democracy in China, academics Tianjian Shi and Jie Lu state that Chinese have a widely shared view that as long as the Chinese government "serves the people" it is deemed democratic and legitimate.

== Democracy dimensions ==
The general Chinese public has virtually no say on how the top leaders of the country are elected, which violates the right to be a candidate as a democratic dimension for the conduct free and fair elections.

The PRC is considered internationally to be amongst the least democratic countries in the world. It has consistently been ranked amongst the lowest as an "authoritarian regime" by the Economist Intelligence Unit's Democracy Index, ranking at 156th out of 167 countries in 2022. According to 2023 V-Dem Democracy indices China is the third least electoral democratic country in the world and ranked second least electoral democratic country in Asia according to V-Dem Democracy indices in 2023. Hong Kong was ranked 14th least electoral democracy in Asia according to V-Dem Democracy indices in 2023. According to Civicus, China's civic space is rated as "closed."

== Influence of traditions ==
=== Confucianism ===
Analyzing survey data from 2002, academic Tianjin Shi contends that the view of democracy that Chinese people support is the Confucian idea of minben 民本 (meaning that the people are the root of state power), a concept which differs significantly from Western views of democracy.

In the mid-1980s, the idea of "Confucian democracy" developed some interest among intellectuals. This group cointended that aspects of Confucianism are compatible with democratic values and can promote liberal democracy. In their view, minben and datong 大同 (great harmony) are consistent with the Western conception of human rights.

==== Social harmony ====
A primary motivation within traditional Chinese philosophy is to preserve social harmony. It looks unfavorably upon anyone who attempts to disrupt this placidity. The election process that takes place in modern liberal democracy directly opposes this ideal. During election campaigns, the issues most frequently discussed are the ones that are highly charged emotionally and politically. In contemporary U.S. elections, controversial issues like abortion, gay marriage, military engagement in the Middle East are at the forefront of campaigns. Chinese Confucians consider these controversial issues to be cleavages within the fabric of social harmony. Western politicians rely on utilizing these social cleavages to garner support from voters. In Chinese culture it would be an impropriety for a politician to exploit these social cleavages to achieve the personal goal of getting elected. Consequently, many of the more traditionalist Chinese people consider the election process of the West and western-influenced democracies to be quite arguably inappropriate as per Chinese culture.

==== Serve the common good, not the majority ====
Another motivation in Chinese culture is to benefit the common good. Elected representatives serve the interests of their individual constituents. If they do not adequately represent the beliefs of their constituency they will not be re-elected. Academic Wei Pan claims that people of a traditionalist Chinese perspective tend to believe that the collective good of the people is under-represented in a democracy, which instead reflects majoritarianism.

==== The weight of the Confucian family ====
Another frequently cited argument against democracy in China relates to the importance of the family. Familial relationships form the backbone of China's social structure. People are more concerned with their family than with politics. Based on this aspect of Chinese culture, many traditionalist Chinese viewpoints emphasize that in the absence of a strong authoritarian government, Chinese society would disintegrate. Thus in the eyes of many, a democracy would be too weak for Chinese society.

=== Christian influences ===
As per some points of view, there is arguably a correlation between Christianity and democracy, perhaps, as per some Chinese perspectives, liberal democracy has its historical basis in Christian culture. As a result, most current forms contain philosophical remnants of those probable origins. One such trace of Christianity is the empowerment of the individual. Christian concepts consider each individual to be sacred in the eyes of God. The concept of liberal democracy rests on all this sense that the individual has inherent worth regardless of his place within social hierarchies.

Traditional Chinese culture makes no such claim. In fact, the philosophical significance of the individual is often identified as an area of incompatibility between democracy and Chinese culture. Confucian societies are centered on familial relationships; an individual had no authority to revolt against these societal ties. An individual disconnected from the family is widely considered an outcast and relegated to the bottom of the social ladder. Confucianism lacks a universal reverence for the individual; personal status in Confucian communities is inexorably linked to one's position within the social hierarchy. In this context, many individual rights cannot exist in the same way they do in the West. Naturally the right of the individual to partake in the direct appointment of a ruling official is an ideological inconsistency with traditional Confucian society.

=== Chinese pragmatism ===
==== Disassociation of democracy and well-being ====
A counterpoint to these examples is that as time has progressed, anti-democratic rhetoric has moved away from the philosophical and into the pragmatic. The boom of the Four Tigers and other growing Asian economies has severed the links between Western culture and material wealth in the eyes of many Chinese. In the early 1900s, scholars like Liang Qichao conflated democracy and power. For some Chinese, the economic success of Confucian and authoritarian societies challenges the idea that wholesale adoption of Western beliefs such as Democracy are requisite for economic success.

==== Optimism versus pessimism ====
At a fundamental philosophical level, Confucian tradition is contingent upon an idea articulated by Thomas Metzger as epistemological optimism. This expresses the belief that it is possible to understand the essence of high morality and design policies and laws that reflect that knowledge. Confucian society seeks to carry out all daily tasks and rituals in pursuit of fulfilling that universal morality. The modern conception of liberal democracy is grounded in the opposing principle of ideological pessimism. This denies that such knowledge is possible, thus the theory and practice of liberal democracy does not make rules in the pursuit of high morality.\

== Translation ==
The most common modern translation for the English words democracy and democratic in East Asian languages is mínzhǔ (民主). (Note: Japanese: 民主(みんしゅ), romanized: minshu. Korean: 민주, romanized: minju. Vietnamese: dân chủ.) However, in classical Chinese, the compound mínzhǔ (民主) could be interpreted as either a genitive noun phrase which would translate to "people's lord;" or a subject–verb phrase which would translate to "the people govern." The genitive-noun-phrase interpretation was well known in China as a way to refer to the reigning emperor, and was synonymous with another classical word, jūnzhǔ (君主).

The first use of mínzhǔ that deviated from the two above interpretations was found in William Alexander Parsons Martin's seminal 1863 translated book, Wànguó Gōngfǎ (萬國公法; "Elements of International Law"). In order to translate the phrase "whether monarchical or republican," Martin made use of the contrast between jūnzhǔ (君主) and mínzhǔ (民主). The genitive-noun-phrase interpretation would render such translation meaningless, therefore, it has been argued that the subject–verb interpretation was intended here. Furthermore, Martin also translated "democratic republic" as mínzhǔ zhī guó (民主之國; 'country where the people govern'), meaning mínzhǔ actually encapsulated both "republic(an)" and "democratic." The word mínzhǔ went on to be a popular translation for republic in multiple bilingual dictionaries. On the other hand, given that republicanism and democracy were completely foreign to the Chinese under monarchical Qing rule, authors often employed the "people's lord" meaning (genitive-noun-phrase interpretation) analogously. 19th-century newspapers in China (especially those published by Westerners) often equated America's head of state, the President, to China's head of state, the Emperor. An 1874 issue of the paper Wànguó Gōngbào (萬國公報; "International Bulletin") used the phrases Měiguó Mínzhǔ, yuē Bólíxǐtiāndé (美國民主，曰伯理璽天德; 'America's People's Lord, known as "President"'), Měihuáng (美皇; 'America's Emperor') and Méizhǔ (美主; 'America's Lord'). An 1896 issue of Shíwùbào (時務報; "Current-Affairs News") even used the specific phrase xuánjǔ Mínzhǔ (選舉民主; 'elected People's Lord') in reference to an American election. George Carter Stent reinforced this usage in the third edition of his dictionary Chinese and English Vocabulary in the Pekinese Dialect, with min^{2}-chu^{3} (民主; 'people's lord') translated as "President of a Republic," and min^{2}-chu^{3}-kuo^{2} (民主國; 'people's lord's country') as "a Republic." At this point during the late 19th century, four meanings of mínzhǔ coexisted: "people's lord" (an East Asian hereditary monarch), "the people govern" (a Western democratic republic), "the people govern" (Western non-monarchical government, namely democracy and/or republicanism) and "people's lord" (a Western democratically elected leader). There was no distinction between democracy (majority rule) and republicanism (government for the public good).

Meanwhile, in Japan, the word kyōka seiji (共和政治; lit. 'cooperative and harmonious administrative rule'), modernized by Mitsukuri Shōgo in 1845 and reinforced by Fukuzawa Yukichi in 1866, (Note: In Seiyō Jijō (西洋事情; lit. 'Western Affairs'), glossed with repoburikku (レポブリック).) became popular as a translation for republic. Kyōka (now kyōwa) also came from classical Chinese, specifically from an account of the non-monarchical Gònghé Regency. (Note: According to Hozumi Nobushige in Hōsō Yawa (法窓夜話), Mitsukuri wanted to translate the Dutch word republiek, and chose kyōka (共和) after hearing the account in the Records of the Grand Historian from the Confucian scholar Ōtsuki Bankei (father of Ōtsuki Fumihiko). What he actually used that translation for was specifically for Kyōka Seiji Shū (共和政治州), i.e. Furuyēnifude Sutāten (フルヱーニフデスターテン; Dutch: Verenigde Staten).) During the exchange of translated materials, including Martin's Wànguó Gōngfǎ and various translations of Rousseau's Du contrat social, between Qing China and Meiji Japan, mínzhǔ and kyōka were often used interchangeably.

The first recorded example of the Chinese loanword minshu (民主) used to translate specifically the English word democracy was in an 1870 lecture by the philosopher Nishi Amane, who used minshu no chi (民主の治; lit. 'people-governing rule'). (Note: As opposed to kunshu no chi (君主の治; lit. 'monarch-governing rule') used for monarchy.) In his 1877 translation of Du contrat social entitled Min'yakuron (民約論), Hattori Toku (服部徳) used minshu seiji (民主政治; lit. 'people-governing administrative rule') for the French word démocratie. (Note: As opposed to kunshu seiji (君主政治; lit. 'monarch-governing administrative rule') for monarchie and kizoku seiji (貴族政治; lit. 'noble-clan administrative rule') for aristocratie.) Minshu came to be associated more with an ideology, institution or spirit (in such phrases as minshu shugi (民主主義; lit. 'democratic principle'), minshu seido (民主制度; lit. 'democratic institution'), and minshu seishin (民主精神; lit. 'democratic spirit')) rather than a specific form of government that had been linked to kyōka. In a 1916 issue of the magazine Chūō Kōron, the Taishō political scientist Sakuzō Yoshino distinguished the two senses of the English loanword demokurashī (デモクラシー): he associated minshu shugi (民主主義; lit. 'principle whereby the people govern') with a legal form of government that did not (and still does not) exist in Japan, and his own coinage minpon shugi (民本主義; lit. 'principle rooted in the people') with a political ideology that could (and still can) be implemented as constitutional monarchy in Japan. In other words, some Taishō authors started to give minshu shugi the form-of-government meaning of kyōka, while pushing for minpon shugi with the ideology meaning. However, minpon shugi did not quite catch on, and minshu shugi was used for both meanings of democracy by subsequent bilingual dictionaries.

On the other hand, the Japanese loanword gònghé (共和) saw a rise in popularity in 20th-century China. The defeat of the Russian absolute monarchy by the Japanese constitutional monarchy contributed to its 1906 peak in published materials by Qing aristocrats. Usage of gònghé among these constitutional monarchists continued to trump that of mínzhǔ during the following years. Some aristocrats, priding themselves as more virtuous and qualified to govern, had already attempted to distinguish mínzhǔ as democratic government by the people, and gònghé as government by a select few wise men like the republics of old. In this regard, gònghé was reinterpreted as "cooperative and harmonious" government between the monarch and his subjects, not true republicanism. Opposing the constitutional monarchists were the revolutionaries, who aimed to abolish the monarchy altogether. Chief among these actual republicans was Sun Yat-sen, who thought it was the people who were qualified to govern, and who went on to develop the Three Principles of the People. In this regard, gònghé was a stand-in for mínzhǔ as democratic government by the people. Although the victorious Xinhai Revolution and the founding of the "Republic of China" (中華民國; Zhōnghuá Mínguó; 'Middle Huá People's Country') (Note: Sun Yat-sen and his colleagues explicitly chose mínguó (民國; 'people's country') over the Japanese loanword gònghéguó (共和國) to emphasize his direct democracy aspirations.) seemed to show promise at first, Yuan Shikai's attempt to restore constitutional monarchy and the subsequent turmoil proved that it was the duplicity of the constitutional monarchists that helped realize the revolutionaries' gònghé aspirations (democratic republicanism), which turned out to be merely nominal and illusory. The failure and eventual downfall of the Republic resulted in the later negative connotation of gònghé and the revival of mínzhǔ.

Among the 19th-century translations of democracy in China, mínzhèng (民政) was frequently found. This word traditionally meant "popular/civil administration," or administration dealing with people. Contemporary foreign lexicographers intended it to mean "people's administration," or administration by the people, instead. During the 20th century, while also regaining its traditional meaning of "civil administration", (Note: Today, there is the "Ministry of Civil Affairs" (民政部; Mínzhèngbù).) mínzhèng started to lose ground to mínzhǔ, likely because the Chinese were increasingly aware of "democracy" as a something fundamentally opposite to traditional Chinese government. Constitutional monarchists, such as Kang Youwei and Liang Qichao, viewed mínzhǔ as dangerous, prone to chaos, and may result in the tyranny of a strongman "people's lord." They even used loaded phrases like mínzhǔ zhuānzhì (民主專制; "democratic autocracy") and zhuānzhì mínzhǔ (專制民主; "autocratic democracy"). Despite that, the fall of the Republic of China helped reinvigorate mínzhǔ during the New Culture Movement, whose members were disaffected by the failed implementation of gònghé. For example, CCP co-founder Chen Duxiu criticized constitutional monarchists for nominally claiming to support gònghé, yet worshipping antiquated Confucian ideas that are inextricably tied to monarchy and thus antithetical to gònghé. Mínzhǔ then signified a rejection of the failed gònghé model, a rejection of monarchical Confucian thinking, and an embrace of actual democracy and other Western thoughts. Occasional transcriptions like démókèlāxī (德謨克拉西) and démógélāshí (德謨格拉時) were also used to distinguish from mínzhǔ as a form of government. Of the new concepts under the umbrella of mínzhǔ, the Marxist-Leninist idea of proletarian dictatorship, represented by such terms as wúchǎn jiējí mínzhǔ (無產階級民主; "democracy of the proletariat"), mínzhǔ de díkètuīduō (民主的狄克推多; "democratic dictator") and démókèlāxī zhuānzhèng (德謨克拉西專政; "dictatorship of democracy"), became the foundational thought of the CCP. In his 1918 speech entitled Shùmín de Shènglì (庶民的勝利; 'Victory of the Common People'), CCP founder Li Dazhao used the phrase mínzhǔ zhǔyì (民主主義; 'democratic principle') previously popularized by the Japanese near the end of the 19th century. In terms of meaning and connotation, this new idea of democratic dictatorship (dictatorship of an entire underclass of people) among communists was intended to be different from the idea of democratic autocracy (dictatorship of one populist leader) warned of by earlier constitutional monarchists, as well as from imperial autocracy (dictatorship of one hereditary monarch); yet, the brutal reality of the Cultural Revolution proved they were not so different after all.

== See also ==
- Democracy in Hong Kong
- Protest and dissent in China
- Federalism in China
