= Angang Constitution =

Principles of socialist factory operation developed in China

- Chinese: 鞍钢宪法
- Date of formation: March 22, 1960

The Angang Constitution (simplified Chinese: 鞍钢宪法; traditional Chinese: 鞍鋼憲法; pinyin: Āngāng xiànfǎ), also known as the An-Steel Constitution or the Constitution of the Anshan Iron and Steel Complex, refers to a set of basic experiences of enterprise management summarized by China's Anshan Iron and Steel Company (鞍山钢铁公司) in the early 1960s. This "Constitution" was formed in 1960.

In 1960, Ma Bin (马宾) presided over the creation of the Angang experience (鞍钢经验), namely "two participations, one reform and three-in-one unity", mass technical innovation and revolution, which was called "Angang Constitution" and "Mabin Constitution" (马宾宪法) by Mao Zedong, and was implemented in China. Therefore, Mao was one of the key participants in the formulation of the "Angang Constitution".

== Development ==
In 1958, prompted by the political movement of the Great Leap Forward, workers at Angang laid out rules to challenge the existing operations of their workplace. These ideas were reflected in the March 11, 1960, "Report of the Anshan City Committee Regarding the Beginning of the Movement for Technological Reform and Technological Revolution." On March 22, 1960, the Central Committee of the Chinese Communist Party approved the document and distributed it to various governmental bodies. Mao Zedong designated the document as the "Angang Constitution" and stated that its principles should guide the operation of state enterprises.

The Angang Constitution was an attempt to address the question of how workers could take the initiative and establish new forms of political organization, without which the industrial danwei might end up reproducing the same subordinate relationship of workers to bosses as existed under management at a capitalist factory. It aimed to achieve industrial democracy based on shared responsibilities and equality, which would in turn improve efficiency and morale. The Angang Constitution was a response by workers to the principles of the Magang Constitution, a Soviet model of management techniques, rules, laws, and standards which Angang had previously followed. It departed from Soviet-style technocratic management.

From the perspective of the Anshan City Committee, the Angang Constitution was also a mechanism to assert more control over Angang relative to the central government's industrial ministries.

== Basic contents ==
The basic contents of the Angang Constitution include carrying out a technical revolution, conducting mass mobilization (群众运动), implementing "two participations, one reform and three-in-one unity" (cadres participating in labor, workers participating in management, reforming unreasonable rules and regulations, and three combinations of workers, leading cadres and technicians), insisting on placing politics in command (政治挂帅), and implementing the factory director responsibility system led by a CCP committee (党委领导下的厂长负责制). The system strengthened the role of the CCP in enterprises while also promoting the development of the mass line and increasing development of mass democracy.

In implementing the "two participations, one reform and three-in-one unity," it required office workers to take part in manual labor, managers to work in production, and workers to participate in management. Technicians were required to take part in both production and management. The Angang Constitution also provided for the election of leaders within production units. Mao viewed "two participations, the one reform, and three combinations," as an important and unique experiment in promoting democratic and scientific management of enterprises.

The Angang Constitution also criticized some cadre at Angang for overemphasizing the role of experts and underemphasizing the role of the masses and of revolution.

Like the Magang Constitution which it challenged, the Angang Constitution was a set of guiding principles, not a constitution in the strict sense of the term.

== Significance ==
At the time Mao designated the Report as the Angang Constitution, it received little national attention.

The Angang Constitution began receiving major national attention in 1967 during the Cultural Revolution. During the Cultural Revolution, the Angang Constitution was important in phasing out workplace distinctions between workers and management, and between technical workers and direct producers. It also increased worker creativity and motivation.

Promotion of the Angang Constitution also served the political goal of critiquing "rightist opportunism" in the context of the Sino-Soviet debates.

After Mao's death, Hua Guofeng frequently cited the Angang Constitution as an example of Mao's teaching and thought.

Under Deng Xiaoping's leadership, the Angang Constitution was no longer emphasized in official discourses such as in People's Daily.

== Evaluations ==
Economist and historian Charles Bettelheim visited China in 1971 to study changes in the management of factories following the Cultural Revolution. Implementation of the Angang Constitution at the factories Bettelheim visited impressed him. Bettelheim observed high levels of political consciousness among workers, worker involvement in solving management issues, reliance on production workers for technical innovations, and the changing of unreasonable factory rules and regulations.

In 1996, Cui Zhiyuan compared the Angang Constitution to Post-Fordism, arguing that the Angang Constitution was "the earliest and distinctive challenge to the rigid Ford-style division of labor system" and "an institutional innovation" of the "post-Ford mode of production". "The collective ownership system (集体所有制) of the people's communes was conducive to the democratic participation of the peasants. He further stated that "no matter how many mistakes there were in the implementation of the Angang Constitution, the spirit of economic democracy is still a valuable spiritual resource for China in the 21st century". Gao Hua (高华) criticized Cui's view, contending that the essence of the Angang Constitution is the leadership of the CCP committee and highlighting politics.

He Jiadong (何家栋) and Li Shenzhi said that history tells us that Angang Constitution was only a utopian blueprint at that time, not a reality in life. In reality, the corporate system is led by a CCP committee and putting the secretary in command (书记挂帅).

Academic Cai Xiang writes that in establishing the kinds of managerial rights that workers and intellectuals sought while affirming the value of human beings, the Anshang Constitution "marks a clear difference from the ossified Soviet system of management and bureaucratism as congealed in the Ma[gang] Constitution."

Economist Pao-Yu Ching described the Angang Constitution as "represent[ing] a spirit toward the direction of ultimately phasing out wage labor." Ching writes, however, that before the Cultural Revolution, only lip services was paid to these principles.
