= Magang Constitution =

Enterprise management system originating in USSR

- Chinese: 马钢宪法
- Implied meaning: enterprise management system originating in the Soviet Union

The Magang Constitution (simplified Chinese: 马钢宪法; traditional Chinese: 馬鋼憲法; pinyin: Mǎ gāng xiànfǎ), also known as the Ma-steel Constitution, was a set of enterprise management system that was gradually formed in the Soviet Union in the 1950s and 1960s after decades of socialist industrial construction and development and adopted in China. Nowadays, it has been abandoned.

It is a complete set of rules and regulations for factory management, even rising to the height of the law. Like the Angang Constitution developed in response to it in China, the Magang Constitution is not a constitution in the true sense of the term.

== Development and influence ==
The Magang Constitution was a complete set of factory management practices implemented by the socialist enterprises represented by Magnitogorsk Iron and Steel Works, the largest steel complex in the Soviet Union. It was based on "experts governing the factories", meaning the affirmation of experts and authority. This set of corporate management system was born in the Stalin-era. The name "Magang Constitution" comes not from the Soviets, but by the Chinese. The Magang Constitution was implemented at various factories in China, including at the Anshan Iron and Steel Works.

The Angang Constitution developed in opposition to its principles, and was promoted by Mao Zedong. During the 1980s in China, the model of the Magang Constitution reappeared in the reform literature.

== Main content ==
Magang Constitution was actually developed from the Taylor System and the Ford System. The main content of the Magang Constitution included the implementation of the "one director system" (一长制), "material stimulation" (物质刺激), "experts governing the factories" (专家治厂), and "placing technology in command" (技术挂帅). Under the model of the Magang Constitution, experts controlled production and the factory director exercised strict control.

== See also ==
- Angang Constitution
- Ford System
- Taylor System
