= Details of Democracy =

2007 book by Liu Yu

- Author: Liu Yu
- Original title: 民主的细节：美国当代政治观察随笔
- Language: Chinese
- Publisher: Shanghai Sanlian Bookstore Co., Ltd.
- Publication date: June 2009
- Publication place: China
- Media type: Print (hardback & paperback)
- ISBN: 754-262-958-1

⁤Details of Democracy (Chinese: 民主的细节：美国当代政治观察随笔) is a book by Chinese writer and political scientist Liu Yu. ⁤⁤Originally published in 2009 as a collection of essays, the work explores the workings of American democracy to a Chinese audience. ⁤

Originally a collection of essays written for her blog on the subject of American democracy, the book uses stories and anecdotes to explain the daily mechanisms of democracy. ⁤⁤Liu delves into aspects such as the legislative process, labor strikes, and the role of the media.

Details of Democracy was a bestseller, selling over 300,000 copies in Mainland China and was named Book of the Year by Southern Weekly, The Beijing News, and Sina.com. The book earned Liu the nickname "China's de Tocqueville," in reference to the French political thinker Alexis de Tocqueville who also analysed American democracy.⁤

⁤Details of Democracy is considered a cornerstone of China's liberal intellectual movement. ⁤⁤By offering a clear-eyed view of American democracy, the book sparked discussions about political participation and reform within China.

== Sections ==
The book is divided into five parts, "Power Checks and Balances", "Civil Society", "Welfare-Equality", "Rule of Law-Freedom" and "Characters".
