= Whole-process people's democracy =

Chinese Communist Party concept

- Simplified Chinese: 全过程人民民主
Transcriptions
Standard Mandarin
- Hanyu Pinyin: Quán guòchéng rénmín mínzhǔ

Alternative Chinese name
- Simplified Chinese: 全过程民主
Transcriptions
Standard Mandarin
- Hanyu Pinyin: Quán guòchéng mínzhǔ

Whole-process people's democracy, formerly termed whole-process democracy, is a Chinese Communist Party (CCP) political concept describing the people's participation in, and relationship to, governance under socialism with Chinese characteristics. Whole-process people's democracy differs from liberal democracy in that it is a consequentialist model of political decision-making, aiming to be judged by how well the government is able to improve the socioeconomic lives of citizens, rather than solely being based on democratic processes.

== Development of the term ==
Narratives of a CCP-style "democracy" and democracy in Marxism have evolved in CCP's language since its founding. CCP general secretary Xi Jinping first stated the term "whole-process democracy" publicly on November 2, 2019, while visiting the Shanghai grassroots consultative center for the National People's Congress (NPC). Xi stated, "China's people's democracy is a type of whole-process democracy" in which legislation is enacted "after going through procedures and democratic deliberations to ensure that decision-making is sound and democratic."

The term "whole process democracy" was incorporated into Chinese law in March 2021. The NPC passed the Decision on Amending the Organic Law of the NPC, which incorporated "adherence to whole process democracy." The NPC viewed whole-process democracy as an area where it could make significant contributions. As a result, the NPC led a national campaign (in which local people's congresses at all levels participated) to promote the principle. The CCP then incorporated the concept into its ideology, promoting it and explaining it as an improved model of "socialist democracy" suited for the 21st century.

On July 1, 2021, Xi incorporated the word "people's" into the term during his speech at the 100th Anniversary of the Chinese Communist Party, giving the new name: "whole-process people's democracy." Xi tied the term to "common prosperity." The addition of "people's" to the term emphasizes the Maoist practice of the mass line. The Chinese government's 2021 white paper China: A Democracy that Works emphasizes the whole-process people's democracy perspective in an effort to demonstrate the country's "institutional self-confidence."

== Definition ==
Xi describes four components of whole-process people's democracy, expressed as paired relationships:

1. Process democracy (过程民主) and achievement democracy (成果民主)
2. Procedural democracy (程序民主) and substantive democracy (实质民主)
3. Direct democracy (直接民主) and indirect democracy (间接民主)
4. People's democracy (人民民主) and the will of the state (国家意志)

According to Xi, this results in "real and effective socialist democracy."

== Analysis ==
According to Fudan University political scientist Zhongyuan Wang, the concept's emphasis on "whole-process" is intended to further distinguish the CCP approach to democracy from the procedural qualities of liberal democracy. It includes primarily consequentialist criteria for evaluating claims of democracy's success. In his view, the most important criterion is whether democracy can "solve the people's real problems," while a system in which "the people are awakened only for voting" is not truly democratic.

According to Wang, whole-process people's democracy also serves as a political tool to both defend the Chinese government's governance practices and criticize liberal democracy. In the CCP's view, whole-process people's democracy is "more extensive, more genuine and more effective" than American democracy. Under the concept of whole-process people's democracy, whether a country is democratic should not be measured by the electoral process but instead by the results it delivers to the people. By using the improvement of living standards and development as the measure of democratic success, this framing favors China, which has undergone major advances in development and living standards during the last four decades.

Wang states that the CCP uses the concept of whole-process people's democracy as a means to participate in global discourses on democracy, seeking to deflect criticism and improve its foreign relations. This ties into the government's larger efforts to promote its global leadership.

Zubeda Anjum Niazi argues that the white paper states that whole-process people's democracy is the impetus behind China's development and growth. In another example of the government's promotion of the whole-process people's democracy concept in an effort to increase its "discourse power," then-Ambassador to the United States Qin Gang gave remarks at a conference organized by U.S. think tanks the Carter Center and The George H.W. Bush Foundation for US-China Relations, in which he stated, "Isn't it obvious that both China's people-center philosophy and President Lincoln's 'of the people, by the people, for the people' are for the sake of the people? [...] Shall we understand China's socialist whole-process democracy as this: from the people, to the people, with the people, for the people?"

According to political scientist Cho Young-chul, whole-process people's democracy "remains vague and allows for broad interpretation". He writes that while the concept challenges the hegemony of liberal democracy, the CCP "has a supreme monopoly over the term [democracy] domestically in addition to complete freedom to define what is good for the Chinese people." According to Cho, under whole-process people's democracy, political activity is only possible through, and in agreement with, the CCP. He further posits that "the CCP seeks to emphasize that state-society relations in China are inseparable and that the CCP represents this unified entity."

According to legal scholar Larry Catá Backer, whole-process people's democracy differs from liberal democracy by having a continuous institutionalised system of consultation with the "people" instead of periodic elections. The consultation with the "people" takes place through political organizations, while "the rest" are subject to "dictatorship". Political parties transmit "mass opinion to the comprehensive vanguard leadership and then [transmit] decisions back. Consultation "is available to patriotic members of the community; for everyone else, [there is] the compulsion of dictatorship."

== See also ==
- Democracy in China
- Ideology of the Chinese Communist Party
- People's democracy (Marxism–Leninism)
- Whole-of-government approach
- New Democracy
- State consequentialism
- Procedural democracy
- Direct democracy
- Indirect democracy
