= Great Democracy =

Political term in China

- Simplified Chinese: 大民主
Transcriptions
Standard Mandarin
- Hanyu Pinyin: Dà mínzhǔ

Great Democracy, also translated into English as Big Democracy or Grand Democracy, is a Chinese political term describing the people's participation in politics. Reacting to the events of the Hungarian Revolution of 1956, a group including Liu Shaoqi contended that a process of Grand Democracy should increase people's participation in state and Chinese Communist Party institutions. Mao Zedong expressed an alternative view in which the people should check the power of institutions not through acting within them, but through against them in protest, strike, and agitation. During the Cultural Revolution, the concept referred to expressing the four great freedoms of speaking out freely, airing views fully, writing big-character posters, and engaging in big debates. Contemporary proponents of the idea of Great Democracy include the Chinese New Left, who support the Cultural Revolution-era view of the concept.

== Concept ==
Following the events of the 1956 Hungarian Revolution, a group that included Liu Shaoqi, major figures in the press, and the membership of the democratic parties in China, contended that the three risks of "subjectivism, sectarianism, and bureaucratism" should be opposed through a process of Grand Democracy that increased the people's participation in party-state institutions.

Mao Zedong expressed an alternative view of Grand Democracy in which the people would check institutions not through being incorporated into them, but through acting against them through popular protest, strikes, and agitation.

The Cultural Revolution view of Grand Democracy was expressed through the "four great freedoms" of speaking out freely, airing views fully, writing big-character posters, and engaging in big debates.

== Contemporary views ==
The Chinese New Left generally favors the Cultural Revolution concept of Grand Democracy. For example, Cui Zhiyuan supports Mao's concept of Great Democracy, contending that Mao's view of "righteous rebellion" should be institutionalized as a mean for the masses to express their criticisms.
