= Cui Zhiyuan =

Chinese economist and philosopher (born 1963)

Cui Zhiyuan 崔之元
- Born: 1963 (age 62–63); Beijing
- Education: National University of Defense Technology; Chinese Academy of Social Sciences; University of Chicago
- Organization(s): MIT; National University of Singapore; Harvard University Law School; Wissenschaftskolleg zu Berlin; Cornell Law School; Tsinghua University
- Notable work: Second Liberation of Thought, Liberal Socialism and the Future of China
- Movement: Chinese New Left
- Website: www.cui-zy.com

Cui Zhiyuan (Chinese: 崔之元; pinyin: Cuī Zhīyuán), born in Beijing in 1963, is a professor at the School of Public Policy and Management in Tsinghua University, Beijing, and a leading member of the Chinese New Left through his work on alternatives to neo-liberal capitalism.

== Biography ==
Cui first gained fame as a post-graduate student in 1994 when he published an article named Institutional Innovation and the Second Thought Liberation. He then went on to publish the book Nanjie Village, which along with his previous publications earned him the reputation as one of the founding members of China's New Left movement. Cui was also one of the first scholars to introduce game theory to China. Cui is an admirer of James Meade's work on liberal socialism, reflected in his article Xiaokang Socialism: A Petty-Bourgeois Manifesto. Following Meade's theory, Cui was the first scholar to propose a systematic social dividend program in China, including a "Chinese People's Permanent Trust Fund".

In the 1990s, Cui wrote a series of articles in which he sought to develop the "reasonable elements" of Maoism. According to Cui, Mao-era China included social experiments in mass democracy and economic democracy that could be adapted to contemporary China.

Cui edited Politics: The Central Texts, the selection of key texts from Roberto Mangabeira Unger's three-volume Politics. His selective writings include The Dilemma of the Paradigm of the Invisible Hand: Soft-Budget-Constraint in the Capitalist Economy; Sustainable Democracy and China: Human Development Report 1999, both co-authored with Adam Przeworski for the UNDP; and contributions to Whither China?: Intellectual Politics in Contemporary China. He also co-edited China and Globalization: Washington Consensus, Beijing Consensus or What? and was considered the first person to introduce the Beijing Consensus into the Chinese policy debate.

In 2011, Cui published an article on Zhang Pengchun's role in drafting the United Nations' Universal Declaration of Human Rights in 1948. The article discusses the implications of this discovery in the UN archive concerning Zhang's key role for the current Chinese political and cultural debates—transcending the dichotomy of "western centralism" and "cultural particularism".

Cui's works have also been translated into Korean, including Xiaokang Socialism: A Petty-Bourgeois Manifesto (Korean: 프티부르주아 사회주의 선언) and Is China Going Where? (중국은 어디로 가고 있는가). The latter embodied Cui's article Institutional Innovation and the Second Thought. In addition, Politics: The Central Texts was translated into Korean and published in South Korea. In 2015, Cui was invited to the International Conference on Basic Income held in Seoul to give a keynote speech concerning social dividend.

In 2003, Cui was invited to the London School of Economics to give the Ralph Miliband Lecture titled "The Bush Doctrine and Neoconservatism: A Chinese Perspective". In 2014, Cui was invited to give the Chun-tu Hsueh Distinguished Lecture "Chinese Reform in light of James Meade's Liberal Socialism" at Oxford University.

More recently, Cui has become known for his work on and as a proponent of the Chongqing model as a model for development. He argues that this model could end China's dependence on exports and savings, reduce the growing economic divide between rural and urban areas, and stimulate private business by way of public ownership and state planning. Cui is close to Chongqing's mayor Huang Qifan and served as the associate director of the State Asset Management Committee of the Chongqing government from 2010 to 2011. His views are discussed in the essay collections One China, Many Paths and Conditional Democracy: The Contemporary Debate on Political Reform in Chinese Universities. He has also been critical of recent privatizations of state assets, and has called for more democracy within the party.

In 2015, Cui started a research project called "Experimental Governance: Its Promise and Limits in China" in collaboration with Charles Sabel of Columbia University Law School, a leading scholar on experimental governance. He gave a public lecture at the India–China Institute of New School for Social Research in April 2014 on "Understanding Xi Jinping's Grand Reform Strategy" in light of experimental governance, with Charles Sabel as a discussant. With his current and former students, Cui also runs a free weekly WeChat publication titled "Experimental Governance", with over 80 published issues and more than 2,000 subscribers from academic, policy-research think tanks.

== Views ==
In Cui's view, China should maintain its capacity for "institutional innovation" in order to secure socialism, which he defines as "economic and political democracy." Cui identifies the Angang Constitution as a model of economic democracy and co-decision making.

Cui contends that Mao Zedong's theory of Cultural Revolution is valuable, particularly Mao's concept of Great Democracy. Cui believes the Mao view of "righteous rebellion" should be institutionalised as a mean for the masses to express their criticisms.

According to sinologist Flora Sapio, Cui "has made tacit use of Schmitt in their theorising about governance and politics in China".

== Personal life ==
Cui's father was a nuclear engineer in Sichuan province.
