= Pao-yu Ching =

Taiwanese-American economist

Pao-yu Ching (Chinese: 金寶瑜; born Pao-yu Chou; 10 April 1937) is a Taiwanese-American Marxist–Leninist–Maoist economist and professor emerita of the Marygrove College. Her works focuses on the socialist transition in Modern China, regarding its economics but also the changes in society, culture and women's rights. She is noted for her critical analysis of the Chinese economic reforms of Deng Xiaoping.

== Biography ==
Pao-yu Ching was born in Beijing. She graduated with a B.A. in economics at the National Taichung University of Education in 1960 and emigrated in 1961 to the United States to study at Bryn Mawr College, Bryn Mawr, Pennsylvania, where she graduated with an M.A. in 1963 and a Ph.D. in 1978.

Between 1979 and 2003, she taught economics as a professor at Marygrove College, Detroit, Michigan. She became a Maoist during the Civil Rights Movement.

She has given lectures in Taiwan, China, Hong Kong, The Philippines, Malaysia, Brazil, Argentina, Canada, the United States, Germany, the Netherlands, and France.

== Publications ==
Her books and articles are written in English and Chinese and have been translated to six other languages (French, Spanish, Portuguese, German, Tagalog, Turkish).

=== Books ===
- 1996 - Deng-Yuan Hsu and Pao-yu Ching, Rethinking Socialism: What is Socialist Transition?, ChingKang Mountains Institute
  - Republished in 2017 by Foreign Languages Press with a new foreword
  - French translation "Repenser le Socialisme : Qu'est ce que la transition socialiste ?" published in 2018 by Editions Soleil Rouge
- 2005 - Globalization and Crisis of Capitalism (Published in Chinese as 全球化與資本主義危機)
- 2012 - Revolution and Counterrevolution, Institute of Political Economy, Manila
- 2019 - From Victory to Defeat: China's Socialist Road and Capitalist Reversal, Foreign Languages Press, with a preface by J. Moufawad-Paul
  - Turkish translation "Zaferden Yenilgiye: Çin'in Sosyalist Yolu ve Kapitalizme Geri Dönüşü", published in 2020 by Patika Kitap
- 2020 - The Road of the Chinese Revolution, Pipan yu Zaizao, Taipei (Published in Chinese as 中國革命的道路)

=== Notable articles ===
- 1988 - "The Impact of Technological Changes on Women in Rural China, 1958-1978" presented at the '88 Tokyo Symposium on Women held in August, 1988 in Tokyo, Japan, published in Proceedings of the '88 Tokyo Symposium on Women, December, 1988, pp. 426–437.
- 2011 - "China: Continuing Class Struggle Sixty-Two Years after the Revolution" in Journals, August 2011, Institute of Political Economy, Manila
- 2017 - "The Current Phase of Imperialism and China" in Lenin's Imperialism in the 21st Century, Institute of Political Economy, Manila
