= Liu Yu (political scientist) =

Chinese writer and political scientist

- 刘瑜
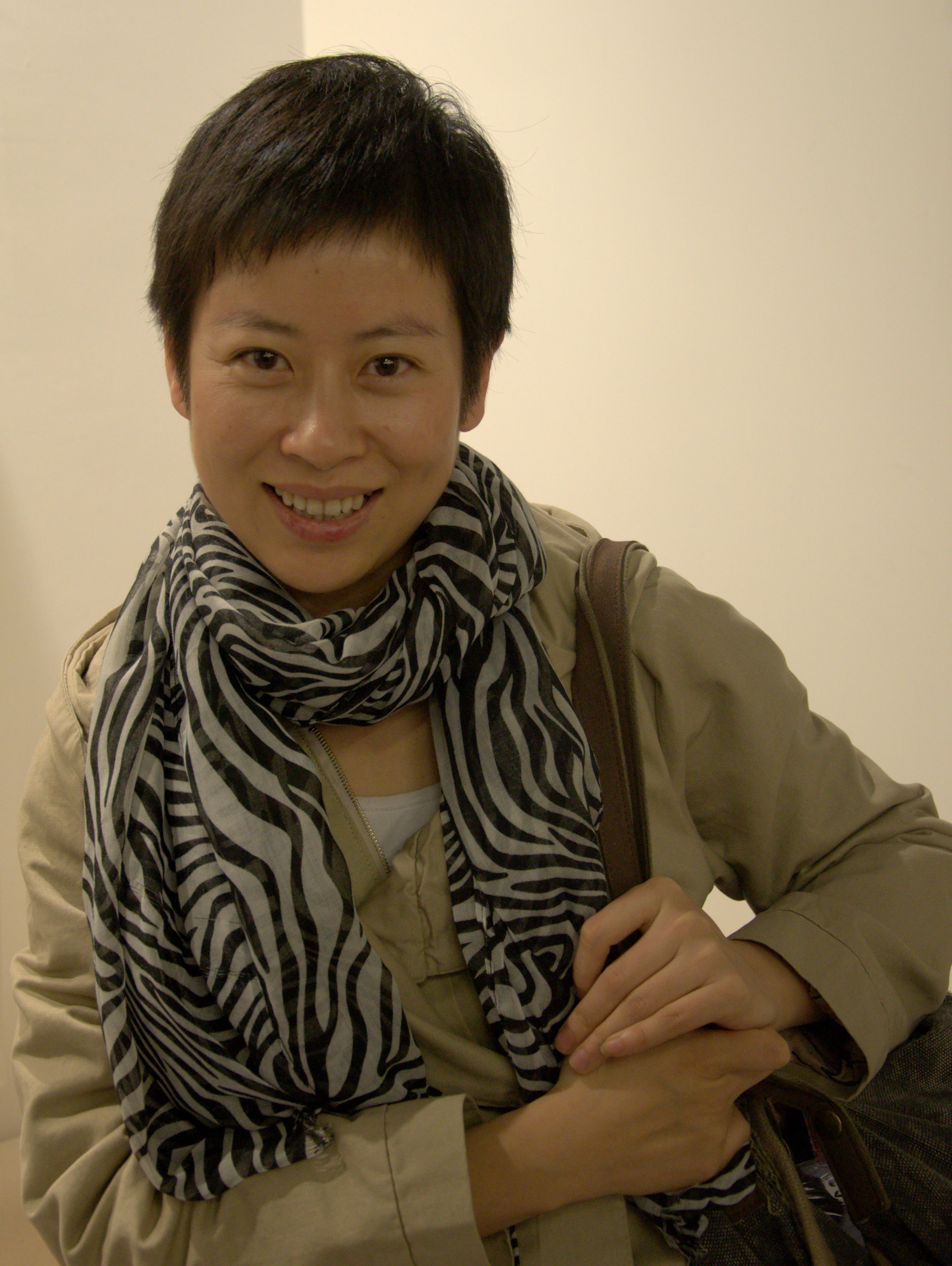
- Liu in 2010
- Born: 24 December 1975 (age 50); Poyang County, Jiangxi, China
- Education: Renmin University of China (BA); Columbia University (PhD)
- Occupations: Writer, political scientist
- Years active: 2000–present
- Spouse: Zhou Lian

Liu Yu
- Simplified Chinese: 刘瑜
- Traditional Chinese: 劉瑜
Transcriptions
Standard Mandarin
- Hanyu Pinyin: Liú Yú
- IPA: [ljǒʊ y̌]

Liu Yu (born 24 December 1975) is a Chinese writer and political scientist. She is a professor of political science at Tsinghua University in Beijing. A prominent spokeswoman for Chinese liberalism, Liu's book Details of Democracy, an introduction of the workings of American democracy to a Chinese audience, was acclaimed as a creative and well-written cornerstone of the ideological movement.

== Early life and career ==
Liu was born 24 December 1975 in Poyang County, Jiangxi. She received her Bachelor's and Master's degrees in political science from Renmin University of China in Beijing's Haidian District in 1996 and 1999 respectively. From 2000 to 2007, she lived in the United States, where she attained a PhD in political science from Columbia University and was a postdoctoral researcher at Harvard University in the Fairbank Center for Chinese Studies. From 2007 to 2010, she was a lecturer at the University of Cambridge.

Liu began blogging about and discussing politics online in 2000. She emerged as a writer of web fiction in the early 2000s, serialising her novel Lonely as a Planet (孤独得像一颗星球) in 2003; the work became popular amongst American internet readers. Lonely as a Planet and her later work So, Where is Love? (那么，爱呢) were later published in China to little acclaim. In 2004, she began writing political commentary in the Chinese media under the pseudonym "Drunken Piano" (醉钢琴). Liu developed a reputation as a "cynical, angry youth" who drew a significant fanbase. Commentators also described her writing style as unusual for a female author. Nonetheless, Liu shunned media attention, going as far as to call seeking a fanbase "shameful".

== Breakthrough and academic career ==
In 2009, Liu published Details of Democracy, a collection of essays originally written for her blog on the subject of American democracy. The book aspired to introduce the daily mechanisms of democracy to a Chinese audience, explaining processes from a relatable position of stories and anecdotes, rather than jargon. Details of Democracy became a bestseller and made Liu famous, gaining her a reputation as "China's de Tocqueville". It became a cornerstone of Chinese liberal thought, respected for its open support of democracy couched in "creative allusions, roundabout references, and ironic wit" to avoid suppression by the Chinese Communist Party. Liu's view of the United States was compared to Voltaire's impression of China, both seeing in foreign empires embodiments of the values missing in their homelands.

Liu became an associate professor of political science at Tsinghua University, the highest-ranked university in Asia, in 2010. She cultivated a reputation as "one of China's best-known America-watchers" and became a popular public speaker as one of the faces of Chinese liberalism. Throughout the late 2000s and early 2010s, Liu took an optimistic view of Chinese democratisation, predicting a radical democratic shift in the next decade. Contrary to her expectations, China grew more authoritarian over the 2010s; this had consequences for Liu's career, as the increased repression of liberal voices impeded her ability to land speaking roles or teach her positions. She told Ian Johnson that this was a chilling effect of government censorship, but that it should not be interpreted as the failure of the "Internet Spring" entirely, and that the full consequences of China's 2000s liberalism were yet to be seen.

In 2012, Temple University assistant professor of communications Xu Kaibin, later a professor of journalism at Wuhan University, published a criticism of Liu's academic career on the nationalist news site Guancha. Xu accused Liu of having few peer-reviewed publications and of being less academically accomplished than expected for Tsinghua faculty, or indeed for Tsinghua graduate students. Liu responded by arguing that Xu's assessment of her papers was out of date, and that he was overapplying publication counts expected in other fields to her own; she also stated that while her publication count was relatively low for tenure-track faculty, it was understandable in the context that she also blogged, taught a high teaching load, and moved across three continents in six years. Liu and her husband Zhou Lian also criticised Xu for insinuating that Liu had misrepresented her tenure-track lecturing position at Cambridge, which he denied.

In 2023, Liu's book Day Two: Gains, Losses, and Choices of New Democracy (巨变第二天; jubian di er tian) was published by the Chinese University of Hong Kong Press. Liu discusses two types of democracy: populist democracy, which Liu describes as idealistic and "thick", and "liberal democracy" which Liu describes as realistic and "thin". In Liu's view, the goal of populist democracy is the "rule of the people" and the means to achieve it is "continuous revolution". In contrast, Liu describes liberal democracy as addressing the core issue of "how to rule" and the means to do so is via normative politics. Liu contends that the latter is more realistic.

In her analysis, Liu also distinguishes the concepts of "liberal" and "democracy," which she views as too often tied together. Liu's view is that during the Cultural Revolution, China was "extremely democratic" while also being "extremely illiberal".

== Personal life ==
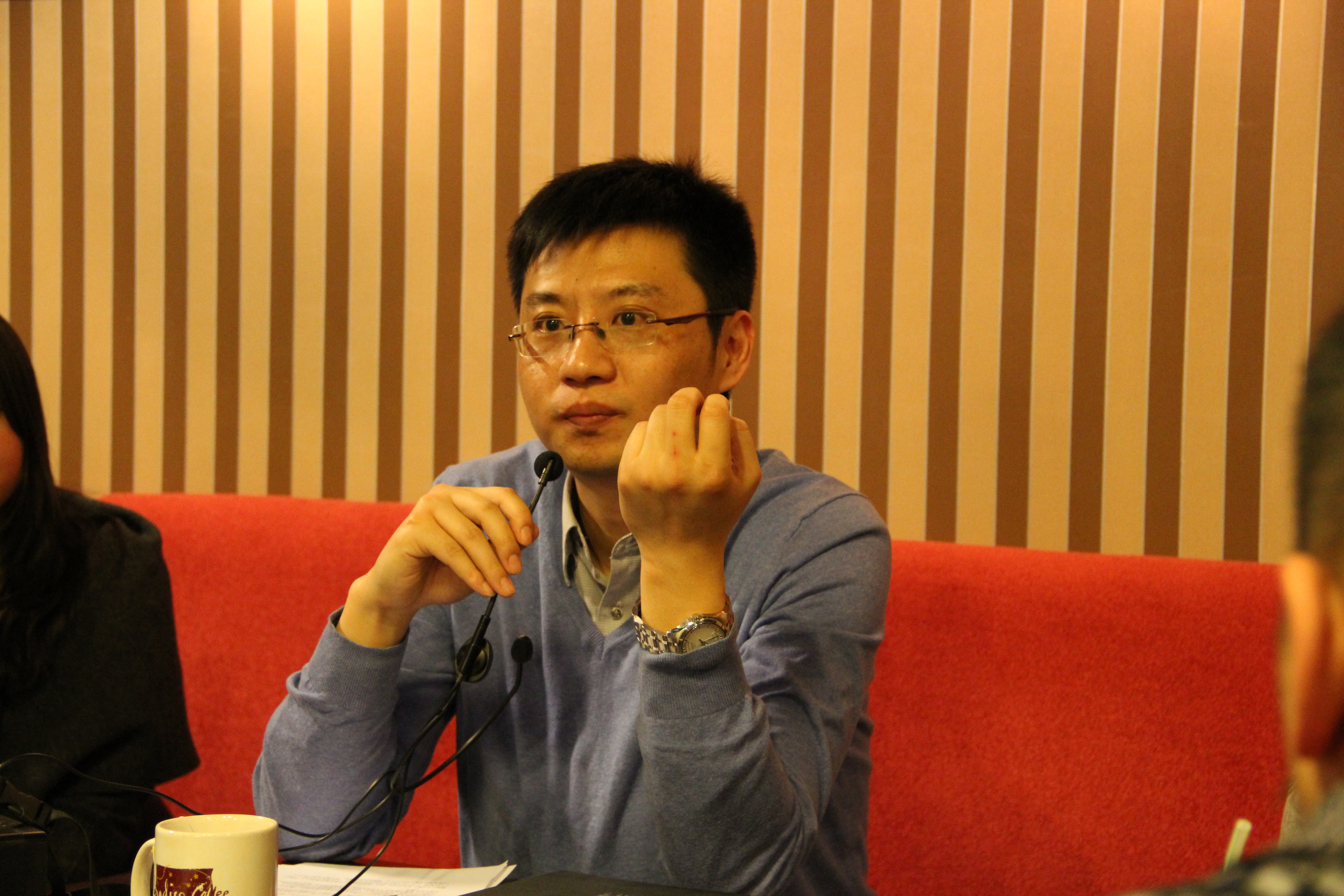
Zhou in 2012

Liu is married to Zhou Lian, author and professor of philosophy at Renmin University of China. Though both members of the couple are prominent academics, they avoid discussion of their private life and have made a pact not to appear in the same public appearances. The couple have a daughter.

== Selected publications ==
=== Articles ===
- Liu Yu (2020), "第三波民主化浪潮的进展与困境：民主稳固与民主衰退" (Progress and dilemmas of the third wave of democratisation: democratic solidity and democratic decline), 探索与争鸣 (Exploration and Free Views), vol. 10
- Liu Yu (2018), "后现代化与乡愁：特朗普现象背后的美国政治文化冲突" (Postmodernisation and nostalgia: the American political and cultural conflict behind the Trump phenomenon), 美国研究 (American Studies), vol. 6
- Liu Yu (2017), "Lessons of new democracies for China", Journal of Chinese Political Science, vol. 98, no. 3
- Liu Yu (2017), "民主转型与政治暴力冲突的起落：以印尼为例" (The rise and fall of democratic transition and violent political conflict: the case of Indonesia), 学海 (Academia Bimestris), vol. 2
- Liu Yu (2017), "Is there a tradeoff between democratization and stability?", Social Science Quarterly, vol. 98, no. 5
- Liu Yu (2016), "The state with a surname", Journal of Chinese Governance, vol. 1, no. 3

=== Books ===
- Liu Yu (2013), 观念的水位 (The Water Level of Ideology), Zhejiang University Press, ISBN 9787308108584
- Liu Yu (2009), 民主的细节：当代美国政治观察 (Details of Democracy: Observations on Contemporary American Politics), Shanghai Shanlian Bookstore, ISBN 9787542636201
- Liu Yu (2023), 巨变第二天 (Day Two: Gains, Losses, and Choices of New Democracy), Chinese University of Hong Kong Press, ISBN 978-988-237-296-2
