= China: Democracy That Works =

2021 PRC white paper on its view of democracy

China: Democracy That Works (Chinese: 中国的民主; lit. 'China's Democracy') is a white paper issued by China's State Council Information Office on 4 December 2021.

== Content ==
The white paper lays out various aspects of the Chinese political system, describing it as a whole-process people's democracy. It discusses both participatory and performance aspects of the Chinese system. These include the formal aspects of the people's congresses system, local elections and the Chinese People's Political Consultative Conference, as well as avenues for participation in policy formation and civil society such as Legislative Information Offices, employees' congresses and Grid Community Management Teams.

This white paper contends that there is no fixed model of democracy and China is a democratic country. It also criticizes other countries for claiming the sole right to define democracy and using that status to impose themselves on other countries. According to the white paper, is not limited to "one person, one vote", and there are many routes a country may use to realize democracy which may better suit their context. Observers contend that China issued this white paper to compete with the US for the right to speak about democracy and to counter the US president Joe Biden's hosting of the Summit for Democracy.

The paper states, "Democracy is not a decorative ornament, but an instrument for addressing the issues that concern people."
