= Cauci =

Early Irish population group

Ptolemy's Tribes in Ireland

The Cauci (Καῦκοι) were a people of early Ireland, uniquely documented in Ptolemy's 2nd-century Geography, which locates them roughly in the region of modern County Dublin and County Wicklow.

== Theories ==
In the early 19th century, comparative linguists, notably Lorenz Diefenbach, identified the Cauci with the Germanic Chauci of the Low Countries and north-western Germany, a parallel already drawn by earlier antiquarian scholarship. Proponents of this view also pointed to the fact that the Manapii (Μανάπιοι), who in Ptolemy's map border the Cauci to the south, likewise bear a name that is almost identical to that of another continental tribe, the Belgic Menapii in north-eastern Gaul.

This correspondence appeared to testify to population movements between the two regions. The linguistic aspect of this hypothesis was developed in the early 20th Century by Julius Pokorny, although the Cauci-Chauci association was not universally accepted. This early scholarship also drew attention to apparent parallels among supposedly Celtic or Celticized peoples of the Iberian Peninsula, specifically a leader of the Lusitani named Kaukainos (Καυκαῖνος), and a city called Kauka (Καύκα) (modern Coca), inhabited by Kaukaioi (Καυκαῖοι), among the Vaccaei, a possibly Hispano-Celtic speaking tribe of the Iberian Peninsula.

With regard to possible descendants of the Irish Cauci, Pokorny and Ó Briain respectively favoured the obscure medieval septs of Uí Cuaich, a group placed in the vicinity of Allen, County Kildare in Hogan's Onomasticon and the Cuachraige, part of the Ua Fairchelláin according to the 12th Century Book of Glendalough, though in neither case has a connection been demonstrated.
