= Labor relations in China =

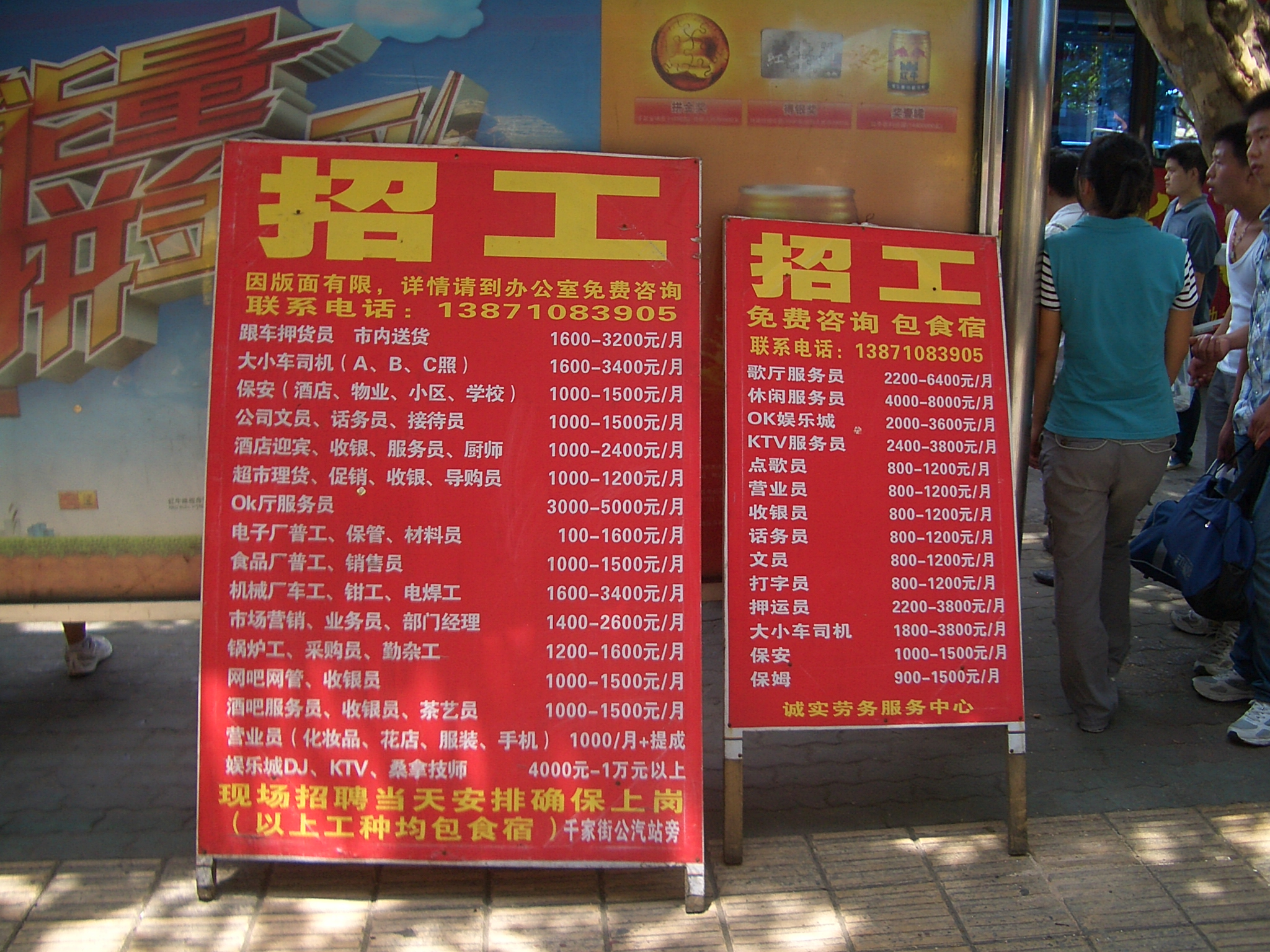
"Help wanted" ads in Wuhan

As the economy of the People's Republic of China has developed, issues of labor relations have evolved. Prior to the reform and opening up, Chinese citizens were only allowed to work where they originated from. Since 1978, when China began labor force reforms, the overwhelming majority of the labor force were either working at state-owned enterprises (SOEs) or as farm workers in the rural countryside. However, over time China began to reform and by the late 90's many had moved from the countryside into the cities in hopes of higher paying jobs and more opportunities. The only connection between the countryside and the city soon became that there was a huge floating population connecting them. Independent unions are illegal in China with only the All-China Federation of Trade Unions (ACFTU) permitted by the Chinese state and the Chinese Communist Party to operate. China has been the largest exporter of goods in the world since 2009 and the largest trading nation in the world since 2013. As China moved away from their planned economy and more towards a market economy the government has brought on many reforms. The aim of this shift in economies was to match the international standards set by the World Trade Organization and other economic entities. The ACFTU that was established to protect the interests of national and local trade unions failed to represent the workers, leading to the 2010 crackdowns. However, these strikes were centered around foreign companies.

== Background ==
One of the hallmarks of China's socialist economy was its promise of employment to all able and willing to work and job-security with virtually lifelong tenure. Reformers targeted the labor market as unproductive because industries were frequently overstaffed to fulfill socialist goals and job-security reduced workers' incentive to work. This socialist policy was pejoratively called the iron rice bowl. The iron rice bowl in 1978 ended collective farming and was then replaced by the "household responsibility system". It provided an informal market for farmers to increase prices above government ceilings placed on goods.

In 1979–1980, the state reformed factories by giving wage increases to workers, which was immediately offset by sharply rising inflation rates of 6%–7%. In the previous year, the inflation rate only rose a small one percent. This was largely because of two elements, price controls were adjusted and there was limited economic reforms that regarded SOEs expenditures. The state remedied this problem, in part, by distributing wage subsidies.

The reforms also dismantled the iron rice bowl, which meant it witnessed a rise in unemployment in the economy. In 1979, immediately after the iron rice bowl was dismantled, there were 20 million unemployed people. Official Chinese statistics reveal that 4.2% of the total urban workforce was unemployed in 2004, although other estimates have reached 10%. As part of its newly developing social security legislation, China has an unemployment insurance system. At the end of 2003, more than 103.7 million people were participating in the plan, and 7.4 million laid-off employees had received benefits.

The 10-percent sample showed that approximately three-fourths of the labor force worked in the agricultural sector. According to the National Bureau of Statistics, in the mid-1980s more than 120 million people worked in the non agricultural sector. The sample revealed that men occupied the great majority of leadership positions. The average worker was about thirty years old, and three out of every four workers were under forty-five years of age. The working population had a low education level. Less than 40 percent of the labor force had more than a primary school education, and 30 percent were illiterate or semi-literate.

In mid-1982, the overall unemployment rate was estimated to be about 5 percent. Of the approximately 25 million unemployed, 12 million were men and 13 million were women. The unemployment rate was highest in the northeast and lowest in the south. The unemployment rates were higher than those of East Asian, Southeast Asian, and Pacific island countries for which data were available but were lower than the rates found in North America and Europe. Virtually all of the unemployed persons in cities and towns were under twenty years of age.

By the 1990s and 2000s, agriculture has remained the largest employer, though its proportion of the workforce has steadily declined; between 1991 and 2001 it dropped from about 60% to 40% of the total. The manufacturing labor force has also become smaller at a slower rate, partially because of reforms implemented at many of the state-run enterprises. Such reforms and other factors have increased unemployment and underemployment in both urban and rural areas. Women have been a major labor presence in China since the People's Republic was established. Some 40–45 percent of all women over age 15 are employed.

China's estimated employed labor force in 2005 totaled 791.4 million persons, about 60% of the total population. During 2003, 49% of the labor force worked in agriculture, forestry, and fishing; 22% in mining, manufacturing, energy, and construction industries; and 29% in the services sector and other categories. In 2004 some 25 million persons were employed by 743,000 private enterprises. Urban wages rose rapidly from 2004 to 2007, at a rate of 13 to 19% per year with average wages near $200/month in 2007.

In the Seventh National Population Census conducted by the National Bureau of Statistics of China the population in China is 1.4 billion. China's population growth has slowed since the 20th century and has maintained a mild growth in population. The average household size in China is 2.62 people, this can be attributed to the rise in better work opportunities and conditions for those living in the city. In higher education, there were 218.36 million people with a university level of education. In addition, illiteracy rates dropped from 4.08% to 2.67%. The reform and push for education in China has led them to create more skilled workers centered around urban areas. Regarding Urban and rural populations there are 901.99 million living in urban spaces which account for 63.89% of the population compared to 509.79 million people living in rural areas of China which account for the 36.11% remaining percent. The continuous shift between rural workers migrating into cities for more opportunities continue. This can be attributed to growth in industrialization, information, and agricultural modernization. Many of these rural residents permanently left their homes to gain permanent urban residency.

However, not all have been able to move the transition smoothly. The number of people who fall under the "floating population" meaning they are living in an area that is not where they are originally registered from totals 492.76 million. Of this population 124.84 million work in other provinces in China from where they live. Furthermore, this exhibits that China needs to reform much of their labor as migrant workers are moving all around the country in search of work. This is a result of market forces penetrating into China in the early eighties that have brought on a plethora of issues, one of them including the "floating population". The basis for these workers are that they theoretically could not access housing and other things that urban hukous could access.

As of at least 2024, China has one of the lowest retirement ages among major world economies, with many working women eligible for retirement at 50 and men at 60.

== All-China Federation of Trade Unions ==
The All-China Federation of Trade Unions (ACFTU) was established in 1925 to represent the interests of national and local trade unions and trade union councils. It is China's only legal union. As of early 2024, it has 300 million members and one million officials, making it the world's largest union. Membership is open to those who rely on wages for the whole or a large part of their income, a qualification that excludes most agricultural workers. In theory, membership is not compulsory, but in view of the unions' role in the distribution of social benefits, the economic pressure to join is great. The lowest unit is the enterprise union committee. Individual trade unions also operate at the provincial level, and there are trade union councils that coordinate all union activities within a particular area and operate at county, municipal, and provincial levels. At the top of the movement is the ACFTU, which discharges its functions through a number of regional federations.

In theory the appropriate trade union organizations have been consulted on the level of wages as well as on wage differentials, but in practice their role in these and similar matters has been insignificant. They have not engaged in collective bargaining or general strikes, as their principal duties have included assisting the party and promoting production. In fulfilling these tasks, they have had a role in enforcing labor discipline. From the point of view of the membership, the most important activities have concerned the social and welfare services. Thus, the unions have looked after industrial safety, organized social and cultural activities, and, provided services such as clinics, rest and holiday homes, hostels, libraries, and clubs. They also administer old-age pensions, workers' insurance, disability benefits, and other welfare schemes. More recently, however, reforms of the social security system have involved moving the responsibility for pensions and other welfare to the provinces.

== Trade union law ==
The Trade Union Law in China mandates all trade unions in China to be linked to the Chinese Communist Party. According to Article 4 of Trade Union Law of the People's Republic of China, which was passed in 1992, and revised in 2001 and 2009, "The trade union must abide by and uphold the Constitution, take the Constitution as the fundamental activity criterion, center on economic construction, adhere to the socialist road, adhere to the people's democratic dictatorship, adhere to the leadership of the Communist Party of China, adhere to Marxism-Leninism, Mao Zedong Thought and Deng Xiaoping Theory, adhere to reform and opening up, carry out work independently in accordance with the trade union charter."

== Labor laws ==
Generally, labor disputes must go through arbitration before they can be litigated in court.

In China there exist labor laws which, if fully enforced, would greatly alleviate common abuses such as not paying workers. In 2006, a new labor law was proposed and submitted for public comment. Enacted in 2008, the Labor Contract Law of the People's Republic of China permits collective bargaining in a form analogous to that standard in Western economies, although the only legal unions would continue to be those affiliated with the All-China Federation of Trade Unions, the Communist Party's official union organization. The new law has support from labor activists, but was opposed by some foreign corporations, including the American Chamber of Commerce and the European Chamber of Commerce. There is some expectation that the law would be enforced. In 2010 a substantial increase in labor related cases brought to court in 2008 was reported.

As per article 36 and article 41 of newly amended Chinese Labour law, the permissible working hour has been set that legally restricts employers from forcefully making workers overwork. According to the article 36 of the law, laborers can not be made work for more than 8 hours a day making 44 hours a week. However, the laws have been violated frequently and are not strictly enforced by regulators. A 2019 survey showed the actual average work time to be about 47 hours, with about 62% reporting actually working more than 40 hours a week. In 2021, the Chinese government announced that it would regulate the 996 working hour system.

In 2020 a law was introduced which banned the use of multiplayer video games for the purposes of organizing a labor union. In the same year, due to COVID-19 Pandemic, the government allowed enterprises to keep adjustment of salaries optional and thereby enabling the business to refrain from offering wage hike to the workers.

== Foreign companies ==
Foreign direct investment (FDI) in China has increased from $1.8 billion in 1983 to $691.9 billion in 2006. According to BBC China has overtaken the US as the world's top country for direct foreign investment. Over the years this has been able to happen as the Chinese government has gradually increased the amount of foreign business that can operate in China. As these restrictions are pulled back in China and more foreign companies begin to invest and maybe move their operations that China needs to reform to not allow any malpractices to continue. An ongoing effort to organize Chinese operations of foreign companies succeeded in 2006 at Wal-Mart. Wal-Mart was the most publicized case in China where they failed to recognize the ACFTU unions resulting in Wal-Mart agreeing to unionize all 62 Wal-Mart super stores. The campaign is projected to include Eastman Kodak, Dell and other companies. It was reported in 2008 that problems with sweatshops persist. By the Fall of 2008 it was apparent that union organizing efforts were widespread with emphasis on foreign corporations.

== Floating Population ==
China's labor force is highly mobile and there is a significant amount of labor migration.

In China, more often than not citizens living in the countryside and rural areas have to move to find work. In China there are an estimated 150 million members of this "floating population" who often find themselves migrating away from their homes and families to urban cities and areas. More often than not these workers spend up to 18 hours a day working in dangerous conditions for only $100 a month. These workers often do not sign a contract so as a result they are offered no vacation time or overtime pay. High population allows contractors and companies to abuse these workers for labor because they are so easily replaceable. However the issue is not whether that Chinese labor standards are too low, because according to the 1994 Labor Law, sought to "require employers to sign contracts with workers that guarantee minimum wage, monthly distribution of wages, a forty-four-hour work week, mandatory rest and vacation, and overtime pay". The Chinese labor laws are even more generous than in some developed countries however, these standards are ignored by both employer and employee often. The reason for which the labor standards in China are not enforced is due to the lack of incentive for any local or national official to do so. Many of these officials' performance evaluations are primarily focused on economic growth within their respective area. Not only this, the motives of these officials are generally viewed above the needs of a highly replaceable, uneducated worker who is from a different part of the country.

== Platform economy labor relations ==
China's platform economy has grown substantially since the early 2010s, with its transactional volume reaching RMB 3.7 trillion in 2021. The platform economy has absorbed a large number of workers from China's decreasing manufacturing workforce and from its population of internal migrant workers. As of 2020, 84 million people worked as platform economy service providers and 6 million were employees of platform companies.

In 2018, the ACFTU identified platform economy food delivery drivers among its eight priority groups of workers for protection. It increased its skills training, legal assistance, and provided some medical benefits for these workers.

According to China Labour Bulletin, there were 138 strikes by food delivery drivers between 2015 and 2022. Ten percent of these strikes involved over 100 participants. Nearly all of the food delivery strikes documented by China Labour Bulletin involved Meituan or Ele.me, and the workers' demands primarily related to pay increases or pay arrearages.

Since the beginning of the 2020–2021 Xi Jinping administration reform spree, administrative bodies and courts have taken an increasingly protective view of platform workers and have issued a series of measures designed to improve their labor conditions.

Starting in June 2021 and continuing through at least 2024, China's judicial system has engaged in a propaganda campaign to promote court cases decided in favor of platform economy workers against the companies for which they did work. The judicial system's newspapers and magazines have promoted coverage of typical cases and relevant studies. Academic Angela Huyue Zhang writes that because court rulings in China do not create precedent, the campaign is a mechanism for guiding courts to tighten regulation in this area, particularly where platform workers lack contracts or have been characterized as independent contractors but are in fact subject to tight monitoring by the platform companies that dispatch them.

In July 2021, eight of China's central ministries issued the Guiding Opinions on Protecting Labor and Social Security Rights and Interests of Workers Engaged in New Forms of Employment (Document No. 56). It specifies that when a platform has labor management over workers but does not fully rise to the level of an employer-employee relationship, the platform must enter into written agreements with the workers that are reasonably sufficient describe their rights and obligations.

On 27 December 2022, the Supreme People's Court published an opinion regarding employment safeguards. It outlined the following factors for determining the scope of labor relationships in the absence of a written contract between a platform and a worker: (1) working hours and workers' ability to set their own workload, (2) extent of the company's management and control over the labor process, (3) whether the worker must comply with specified procedures, disciplinary measures, or award measures, (4) the continuity of service, and (5) workers' ability to determine whether and how to change transactional prices.

== Honda strikes and other events in 2010 ==
=== Honda ===
In May 2010 a strike was permitted to proceed against a Honda transmission and parts plant employing 1,900 in Foshan. The strike, which began on 17 May 2010, has resulted in suspension of operations at 4 Honda assembly plants. The main issue appears to be money with a substantial raise being demanded. Wages at the plant currently average $150 a month, a rate somewhat low for the area. The workers involved are mostly young high school and vocational school graduates with no apparent political agenda. A 24% wage increase was offered by Honda which for many workers would be an increase of about 366 renminbi ($54) a month. News reports on 5 June 2010 reported settlement of the strike with a pay raise of about 34% and other benefits giving workers at the plant a wage of about 300 dollars a month. A second strike, this time at an exhaust-systems plant, also in Foshan, followed. And a third, at a Honda lock plant in Zhongshan, where workers demanded the right to form an independent union. The strike at the Zhongshan was broken in a few days by a combination of concessions and hiring replacement workers.

=== Foxconn ===
On 1 June 2010 it was announced by Foxconn Technology Group, a major manufacturer of electronic products for export, that they would increase wages by 30%. For example, a worker previously paid 900 renminbi ($131.77) will be paid 1,200 renminbi effective immediately. Foxconn had been plagued by worker shortages and a number of worker suicides. A few days later a further increase was announced raising wages of employees who have worked for the company for three months to $294 a month. Experts such as Andy Xie believe that there is ample scope for increased wages in China due to its superior infrastructure as compared to competing low wage alternatives.

=== Toyota ===
On 18 June 2010 there were news reports of strikes at two Toyota parts plants in Tianjin, both operated by a Chinese subsidiary Toyoda Gosei. On 22 June 2010 it was reported that a Toyota assembly plant had been closed due to a strike at a supplier.

=== Minimum wage increases and other events ===
Effective 1 July 2010 the minimum wage in Beijing was raised 20% to 960 renminbi ($140) a month. In Shenzhen the minimum wage will be increased to 1,100 renminbi, about $161 a month in July. In June 2010 there were reports of several other incidents including one in which a government controlled ACFTU union was reported to be negotiating regarding wages with Kentucky Fried Chicken. On 10 June 2010 strikes were reported in 5 additional cities.

A copy-cat strike at a former state-owned, now privatized, textile factory in Pingdingshan, the Pingdingshan Cotton Textile Co., where workers with 20 years service toil for little more than $100 a month was reported on 8 June 2010 by The Toronto Star. According to the Star information about such strikes is not being publicized inside China; information about strikes involving foreign or Taiwanese owned factories often receives more attention.

During the initial Honda strikes the media in China was permitted to report on them, but as strikes spread reporting was suppressed.

== State-owned enterprises in China ==
State Owned Enterprises (SOEs) are an important piece to the Chinese economy. These institutions have gained an important role in the global economy today. In 2000 there were only 27 SOEs in the Fortune Global 500 compared to 2017, there are 102. Only 9 of the 27 SOEs in 2000 were from China compared to 75 of the 102 SOEs they account for in 2017. This increase has led to many more Chinese citizens obtaining stable jobs that also put them at odds with those working at foreign companies.

== Slave labor ==
Forced labor exists in the People's Republic of China under both legal and illegal guises. Unfree labor is not generally addressed by the Chinese authorities, local news organizations, or local NGOs as it is considered a sensitive subject.

=== Brick kiln slavery ===
Brick kilns in China, like around the world, have been the site of unfree labor with most enslaved laborers being the youth, the elderly, and mentally disabled adults. Local communities and authorities are often involved in the trafficking of the victims. These workplaces are known as "black kilns." In 2007 a particularly gruesome case came to light as the result of parents organizing to find their kidnapped children.

=== Forced internships ===
Students in China's vocational schools are forced to accept minimally paid and unpaid internships at local manufacturing firms, often completely outside the industry which the student is being trained to go into. Students are threatened with having their graduation withheld if they do not participate in these internships. Firms which have faced allegations of using forced student labor include foreign manufacturing giants Foxconn and Quanta.

=== Construction industry ===
China's construction industry is closely regulated and many of those working in it are illegal migrants without work permission. Workers regularly face a lack of formal employment contracts, wage withholding, excessive and illegal overtime, and a complete dependence on their employer for food and shelter. Wages are often withheld as long as a calendar year. Around Chinese New Year it is common for workers in the construction to protest their wage arrears. It is estimated that half of Chinese construction workers have had their wages withheld at some point in their career. In 2017 Ministry of Human Resources and Social Security announced that wage arrears would be eradicated by 2020.

=== Xinjiang ===
In March 2020, the Chinese government was found to be using the Uyghur minority for forced labor, inside sweat shops. According to a report published then by the Australian Strategic Policy Institute (ASPI), no fewer than around 80,000 Uyghurs were forcibly removed from the region of Xinjiang and used for forced labor in at least twenty-seven corporate factories. According to the Business and Human Rights resource center, corporations such as Abercrombie & Fitch, Adidas, Amazon, Apple, BMW, Fila, Gap, H&M, Inditex, Marks & Spencer, Nike, North Face, Puma, PVH, Samsung, and UNIQLO have each sourced from these factories prior to the publication of the ASPI report.

Numerous other allegations of forced labor related to the Xinjiang re-education camps have been made since 2017. In addition to working within the camps after release detainees are sent to factories for a mandatory work period often measured in months, people who refuse the forced labor are sent back for additional re-education.

== Hukou system ==
A hukou is a legal document that records basic information for a particular household. The present hukou system was introduced over 60 years ago and is a tool that the government uses to monitor its population. The system has been criticized for impeding the flow of free labor, resulting in idle workers and ultimately degraded national economic performance.

More recently China has been trying to reform this system as a response to the criticisms. How the hukou system works is that each household classifies the residents based on their hometown or where they were born. This especially limits the mobility of Chinese laborers as transference of hukou is only granted in certain cases or when one fulfills the criteria that the government has set. Usually this includes information regarding one's level of education and technical experience. However, this process becomes more complicated in larger cities as many are trying to find work. This has created an imbalance as many flock towards China's cities. As of 2014 there were over 274 million rural workers in cities which accounts for over 36% of the total workforce. Although these workers are in the city, it is harder for them to find and keep jobs compared to those who hold urban hukou.

This also leads to them not being able to acquire basic social entitlements including their children. However the Chinese government places hukou reform at the top of their list. This places a rift between the urban hukou and the rural hukou holders as with holding an urban hukou you are offered more opportunities, which would diminish its value if rural hukou owners started to acquire them. However, since 2014 the Chinese government has gradually blurred the lines between urban and rural hukou. China is seeking to also increase the number of urban residents by granting 100 million urban hukou to rural hukou owners by 2020. Furthermore, China has attempted to lessen the requirements for urban hukou seekers in hopes of obtaining a more mobile workforce while also bringing children out of the countryside at the same time because with the lessened urban hukou requirements more children and families can move into the city for a better life.

== See also ==
- "Abandon all freedom consciously when entering the yard"
- China Labour Bulletin
- Hukou system
- Labor movement in Taiwan
- Labor movement of South Korea
