= Jan Liwacz =

Polish blacksmith in Auschwitz (1898–1980)

- Born: October 4, 1898; Dukla, Cisleithania, Austria-Hungary
- Died: April 22, 1980 (aged 81); Bystrzyca Kłodzka, Poland
- Burial place: Bystrzyca Kłodzka, Poland
- Known for: Making the "Arbeit macht frei" sign at Auschwitz concentration camp

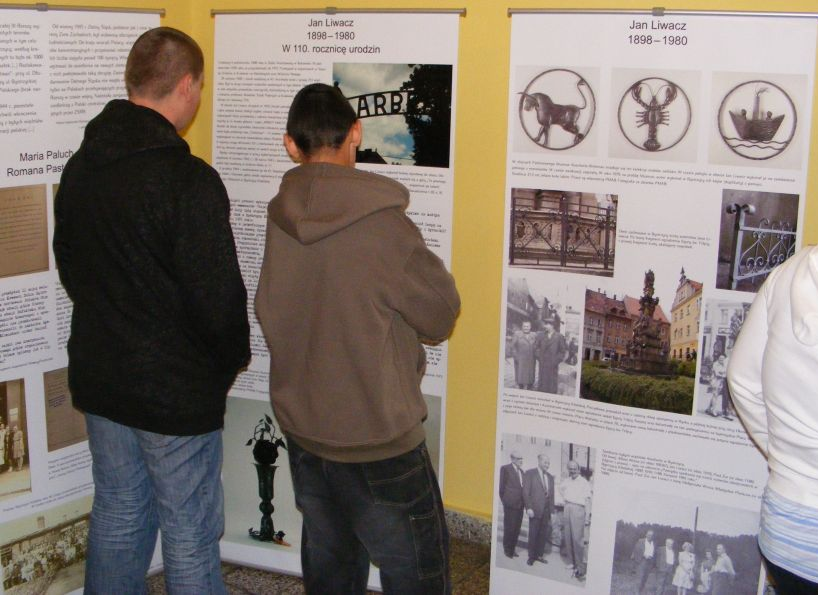
September 2008, Bystrzyca Kłodzka: the exhibition "Jan Liwacz 1898-1980 – 110th anniversary of birth"

Jan Liwacz was a Polish blacksmith and prisoner of Auschwitz concentration camp best known for making the infamous "Arbeit macht frei" slogan over the camp's main entrance gate. When the SS ordered him to make this sign, he turned the letter B upside down in the word Arbeit in what has been interpreted as an act of protest.

He was detained and arrested on 16 October 1939 in Bukowsko, and kept in the prisons of Sanok, Krosno, Kraków, and Nowy Wiśnicz; he arrived at Auschwitz in its beginnings, on 20 June 1940, receiving the early camp number of 1010. As a metal worker he was assigned to a kommando manufacturing the camp's infrastructure elements (gratings, handrails, banisters, chandeliers, etc.). During his stay he was twice condemned to solitary confinement in the penal 11th Block in June 1942 and March 1943, spending five weeks there altogether. On 6 December 1944 he was transferred to Mauthausen-Gusen concentration camp, where he was held in the Melk and Ebensee subcamps.

After the liberation of the Ebensee camp on 6 May 1945, he trekked for Poland with Alfons Wrona, his cell-mate from Auschwitz, and settled in Bystrzyca Kłodzka of the western Recovered Territories. Once there, he started working at a local forge owned by Paul Wolf. When the Wolf family was expelled in 1946, he stayed there as an artist blacksmith. Among others, in 1953, he hand forged (free of charge, as his gift to the city) a fence for the Holy Trinity sculpture and so-called "elevation" on Freedom Square in Bystrzyca. After retirement, he continued teaching artisan smithery in a local vocational school. He died in 1980 and was buried in Bystrzyca Kłodzka.

In 2008, on the 110th anniversary of his birth, there was an exhibition opened in Bystrzyca Kłodzka presenting his life and works.

== Bibliography ==
- "Jürgen Kaumkötter: "Sztuka w Auschwitz 1940-1945" ("Art in Auschwitz 1940-1945"), Oświęcim, Państwowe Muzeum Auschwitz-Birkenau (Auschwitz-Birkenau State Museum), 2005, ISBN 3-89946-051-0
