= Coat of arms of Kłodzko =

Coat of arms of Kłodzko

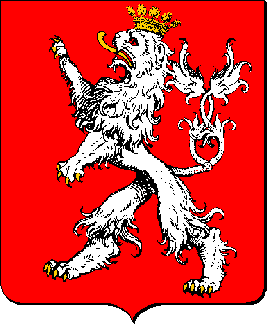
Another rendering of the coat of arms of Kłodzko

The coat of arms of Kłodzko shows a white Bohemian Lion on a red field with a golden crown and a double tail. The coat of arms comes from the dynasty of Czech kings Premyslids.

== Legend ==
Residents of Kłodzko, granted municipal rights by Přemysl Otakar II, the ruler of the Bohemia, decided to go to the Prague court, to ask the king for the grant of a coat of arms, which was the most important determinant of a city in the Middle Ages. The king, after an audience with the delegation, agreed to give Kłodzko a coat of arms, which represented the lion's crown. During the transport of stone sculptures of the image of a lion to Kłodzko, an accident occurred when the statue fell out of the cart and broke in a place where the lion's tail was. Therefore, the messenger once again went to Prague, where he received a new sculpture with arms, with the difference that the sculptor, as a safety measure, made the lion with two tails. This time on the way back, nothing happened, and the disc arrived safely to Kłodzko.

== Coat of arms ==
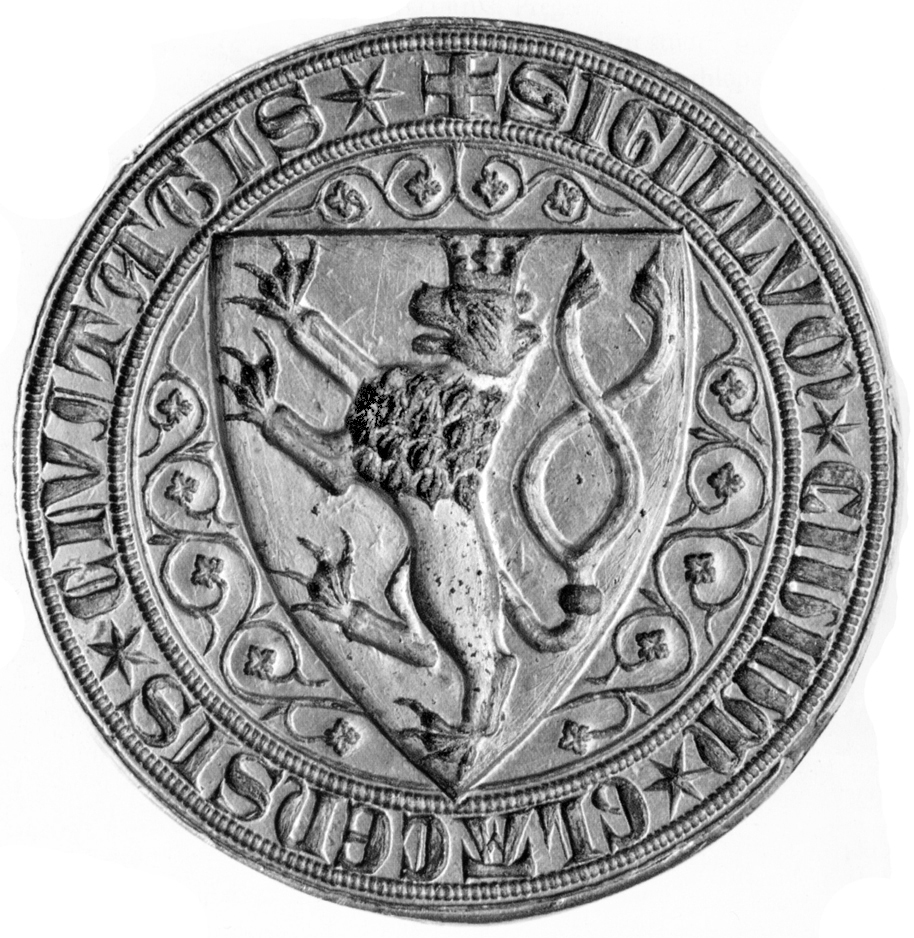
Sigillum civivm Glacensis civitatis. Great seal of the City of Kłodzko depicts Bohemian double-tailed lion (13th century)

In fact, the Kladsko/Kłodzko/Glatz coat of arms was granted to the city by King Ottokar II sometime during his reign (1253–1278). The precise date and circumstances are not known, because the royal foundation charter (or its copy) has not survived. The figure of a silver lion with two tails refers to the heraldic symbol of the Kingdom of Bohemia, to which all the Kłodzko Land belonged from the 10th century until 1742–1748. The earliest image of a lion is preserved on the municipal seal originating in the third quarter of the 13th century.

A similar coat of arms is also borne by the second biggest town in this region – Bystrzyca Kłodzka.
