= Niedźwiedna =

- District of Bystrzyca Kłodzka
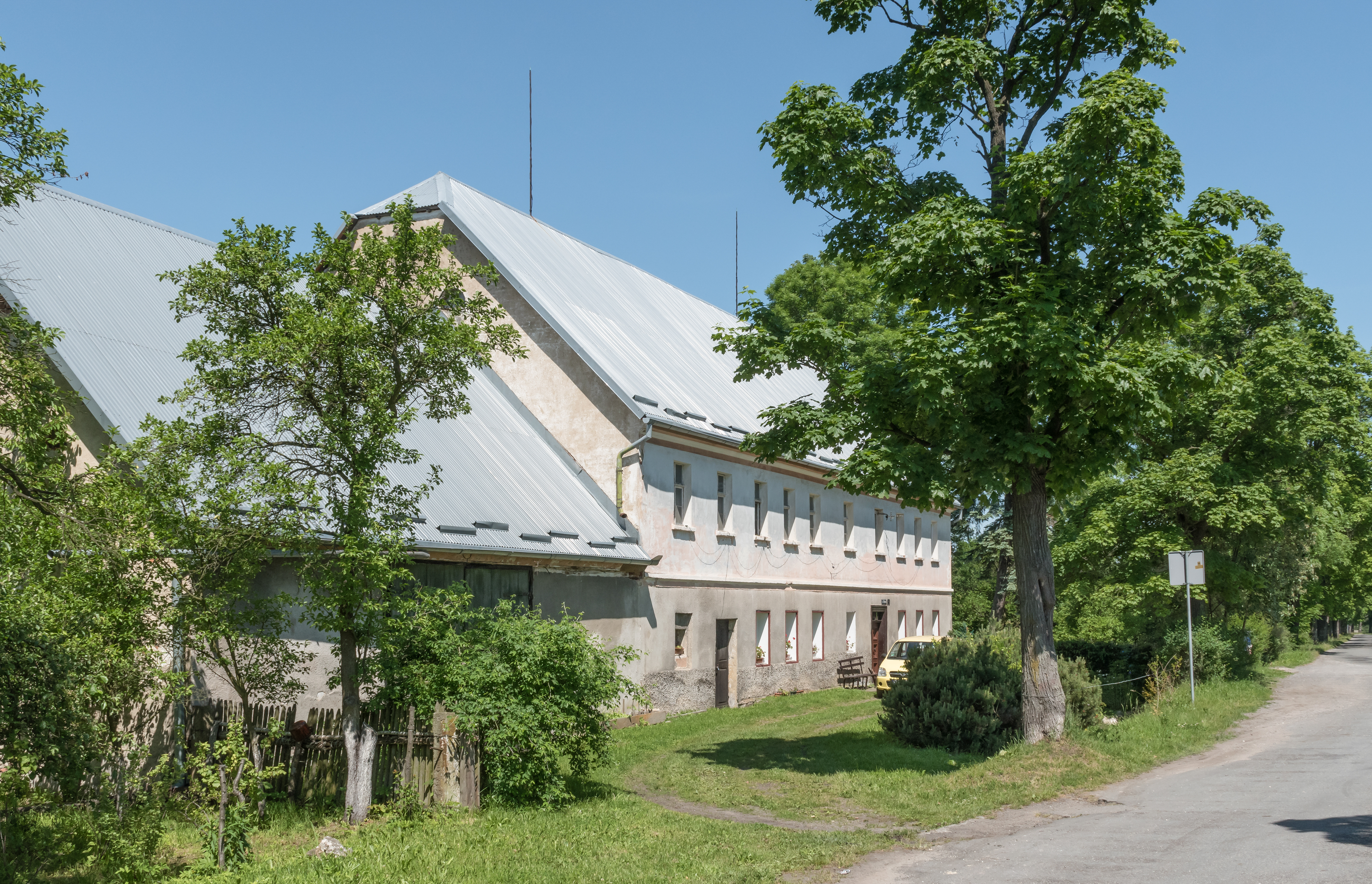

- Location within Poland Location within Lower Silesian Voivodeship
- Coordinates: 50°17′00″N 16°38′00″E
- Country: Poland
- Voivodeship: Lower Silesian
- County: Kłodzko
- First mentioned: 1341
- Incorporated to Bystrzyca Kłodzka: 1961
- Elevation: 350 m (1,150 ft)
- Time zone: UTC+1 (CET)
  - Summer (DST): UTC+2 (CEST)
- Postal code: 57-500
- Area code: +48 74

Niedźwiedna (German: Weißbrod; or Weissbrod(t)) is a district of the town of Bystrzyca Kłodzka, in southwestern Poland, located in the southern part of the town.

The oldest known mention of the settlement comes from 1341. For centuries it was a small village with a dozen houses before being incorporated into the town limits of Bystrzyca Kłodzka in 1961.
