= Abandon all freedom consciously when entering the yard =

Slogan

The slogan of "Abandon all freedom consciously when entering the yard" on the gate of Hengyi New Material

"Abandon all freedom consciously when entering the yard" (Chinese: 进入厂区,请自觉放弃一切自由) is a slogan displayed in December 2025 in Guangxi by Hengyi New Material Co., Ltd., a subsidiary of Hengyi Petrochemical Co., Ltd.. It received a significant backlash after spreading on the Chinese Internet, with critics saying it implied that companies can deprive their staff of their human rights and harm healthy labour relations.

== Background ==
Hengyi New Material Co., Ltd. (广西恒逸新材料有限公司), located in Qinzhou, is a wholly-owned subsidiary of Hengyi Petrochemical Co., Ltd., which primarily produces chemical fibre products. Its registered capital in 2025 was 3.955 billion RMB.

Labour rights in China are protected by the Labour Contract Law of the People's Republic of China and the Production Safety Law of the People's Republic of China, and Chinese labour law does not grant companies in China the right to restrict employees' personal freedom. Meanwhile, The Beijing News noted that some companies in China imposed "unreasonable" regulations under the name of "military administration" or "wolf culture", for example, restricting toilet breaks, forcing overtime, and monitoring private communications. Such incidents are often first revealed online, and government intervention follows when criticisms escalate, a pattern the paper described as "no report, no investigation" (民不举、官不究) by the newspaper. The newspaper argued that such practices are detrimental to protecting labour rights.

== Incident ==
Netizens noticed a new slogan hung on the factory's gate in December 2025, which read, "Abandon all freedom consciously when entering the yard." It sparked controversy on the Internet and forced the company to remove the slogan in the next day, according to Xiaoxiang Morning Herald .

Staff declined to comment and suggested that reporters ask local police instead when being interviewed. Qinzhou police responded that they would not take any measures since the slogan was withdrawn. But they could only ask companies to reform if they refused to withdraw. Officials in the Qinzhou labour department responded that the slogan was surely inappropriate and they would conduct an investigation into it. A reporter found on Hengyi's official account that the factory's gate was hung, "safety first, prevention first; Comprehensive management, full participation" (安全第一，预防为主，综合治理，全员参与).

== Reception ==
The slogan received a negative view from most netizens. They criticised it as a blatant act of violating civil rights, which shows a company's unhealthy working culture. While netizens believed the slogan might be a disciplinary commandment that asks staff to obey occupational safety constraints, reporters noticed that such commandments shall be: "abandon all autonomy when entering the yard" (进入厂区请放弃一切自治). Some netizens had agreed that companies that buy time from employee can restrict their personal freedom.

Most media criticised the slogan's implication and emphasised the importance of building healthy labour relations. The Beijing News described the slogan's wording as "savage" and implied that the company is "unrestricted". The newspaper commented that companies have no right to ask staff to "abandon freedom", and "mindset is uneasy to change even when the slogan changed". An editorial on the National Business Daily described the slogan as "cold shackles" and "inhuman values", criticising the word "consciously" internalised the companies' regulations and denied labour's subjectivity. It also acclaimed the backlash as a "clarification of basic values" that "opposed accepting working spaces or suspending labour rights". The editorial concluded that a stable company is based on trust and respect.

== See also ==
- Forced labour
- Arbeit macht frei
- Abandon all hope, ye who enter here
