= Rudolf Bial =

German violinist, composer, conductor and theatre director

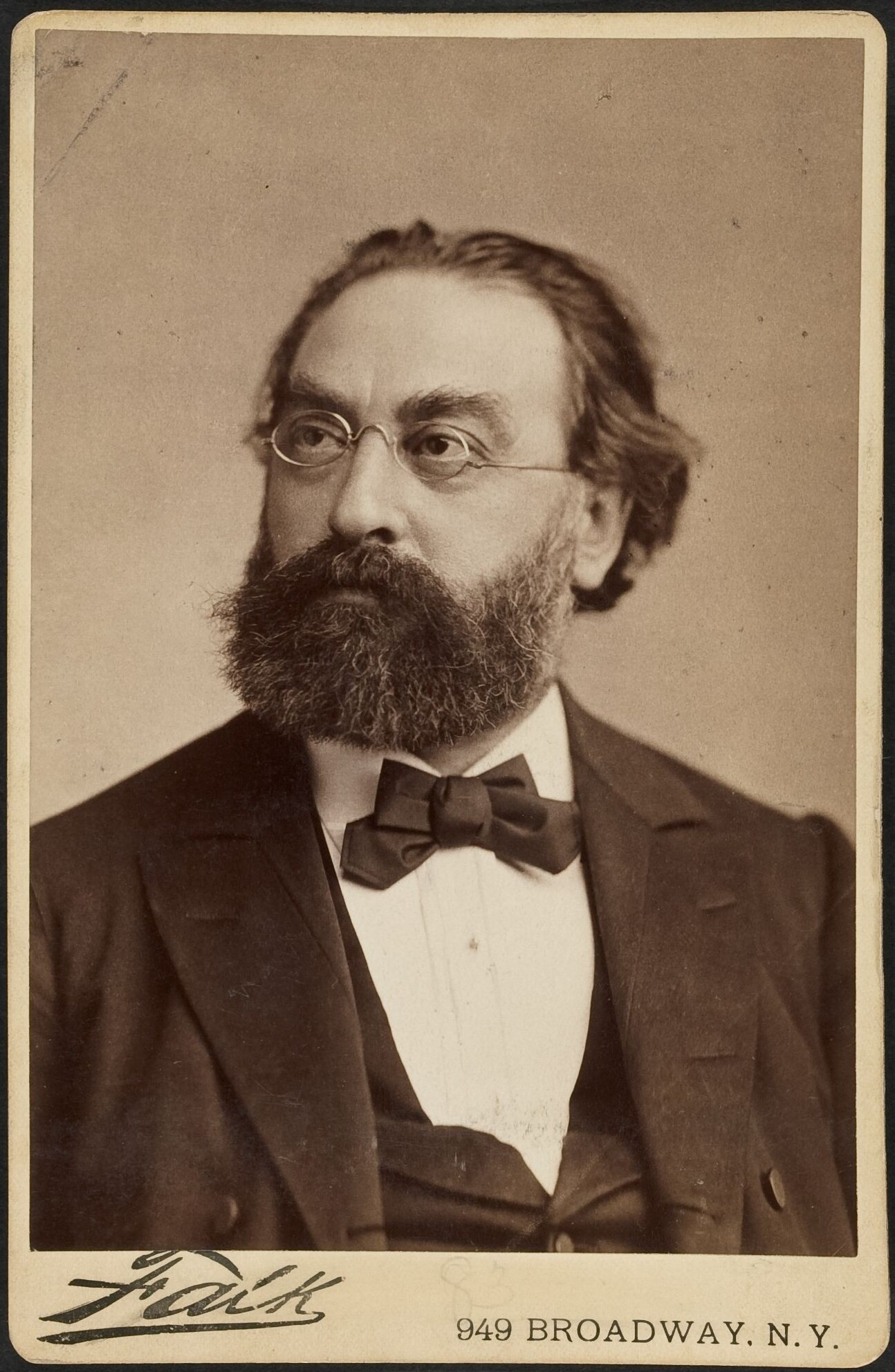
- A portrait of Bial on a cabinet card, c. 1879-81. From the collections of the Houghton Library
- Born: August 26, 1834; Habelschwerdt, Province of Silesia, Kingdom of Prussia
- Died: November 23, 1881 (aged 47); New York City, United States
- Era: Romantic
- Spouse: Therese Graupe
- Parents: Adolph Bial (father); Henriette née Freund (mother)

Rudolf Bial (26 August 1834 – 23 November 1881) was a German violinist, composer, conductor and theater director.

== Life ==
Born in Habelschwerdt, Prussia, Bial received his musical education in Breslau, where he was employed at the age of 15 as the first violinist in the chapel of the local municipal theatre. He was Kapellmeister in Lübeck from 1854 to 1856, then made a concert tour to Australia as a violin virtuoso together with his brother Karl, became Kapellmeister in 1864 at August Conradi's place at Wallner-Theater in Berlin and from 1876 to 1879 was the director of the Krollschen Theater, whose repertoire he refined by cultivating German and Italian operas. In the latter year he moved to New York. There he led a concert band and died at the age of 47.

His brother Karl Bial (1833-1892) worked as a piano virtuoso, composer and music teacher in Berlin. He left behind several pieces for piano and songs.

== Work ==
Among Rudolf Bial's partly popular compositions (in total 130 numbers) his operetta Der Herr von Papillon (1868) had the greatest success.

- 1872: Die Mottenburger, burlesque with music
- 1874: Mein Leopold, burlesque with music (singing burlesque in three acts), premiere 28 September 1874
- 1875: Der Liebesring, burlesque with music (singing burlesque in three acts), premiere 4 December 1875, Berlin, Städtisches Friedrich-Wilhelm Theater
- 1876: Der Registrator auf Reisen, burlesque with music (singing burlesque in three acts), premiere 12 February 1876
- ???: Ehrliche Arbeit, burlesque with music (singing burlesque in three acts)
- ???: Von Stufe zu Stufe, burlesque with music
- ???: Hopfenraths Erben, burlesque with music
- ???: Comtesse Helene, burlesque in three acts

Marches:

- Donato-March for Pianoforte, 1865
- Kladderadatsch-Jubiläums-March, 1866, on the occasion of the celebration of the publication of the thousandth issue of the political satirical weekly Kladderadatsch
