= Arbeit macht frei =

Phrase used on Nazi concentration camps

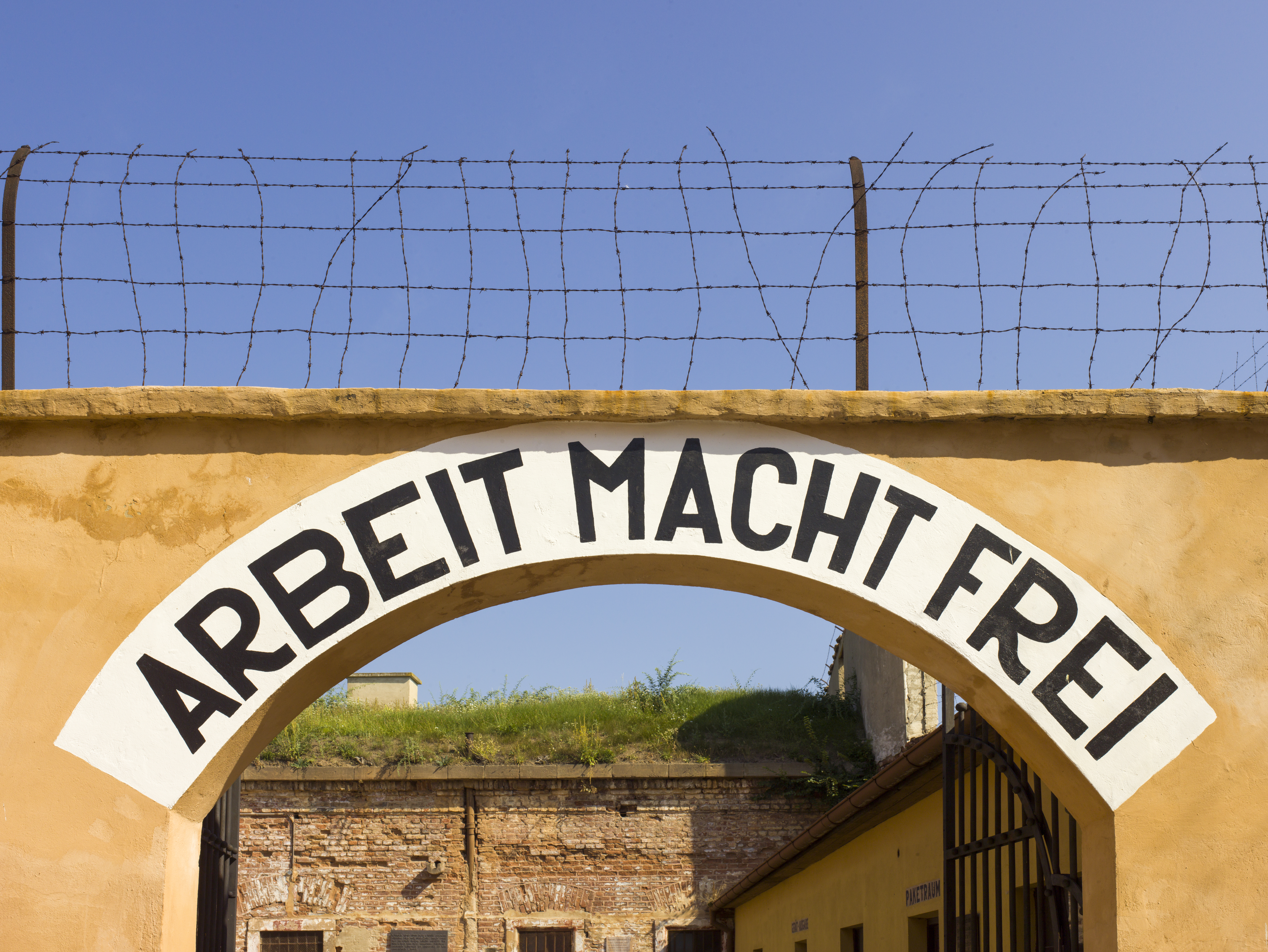
Slogan displayed at the Theresienstadt Ghetto

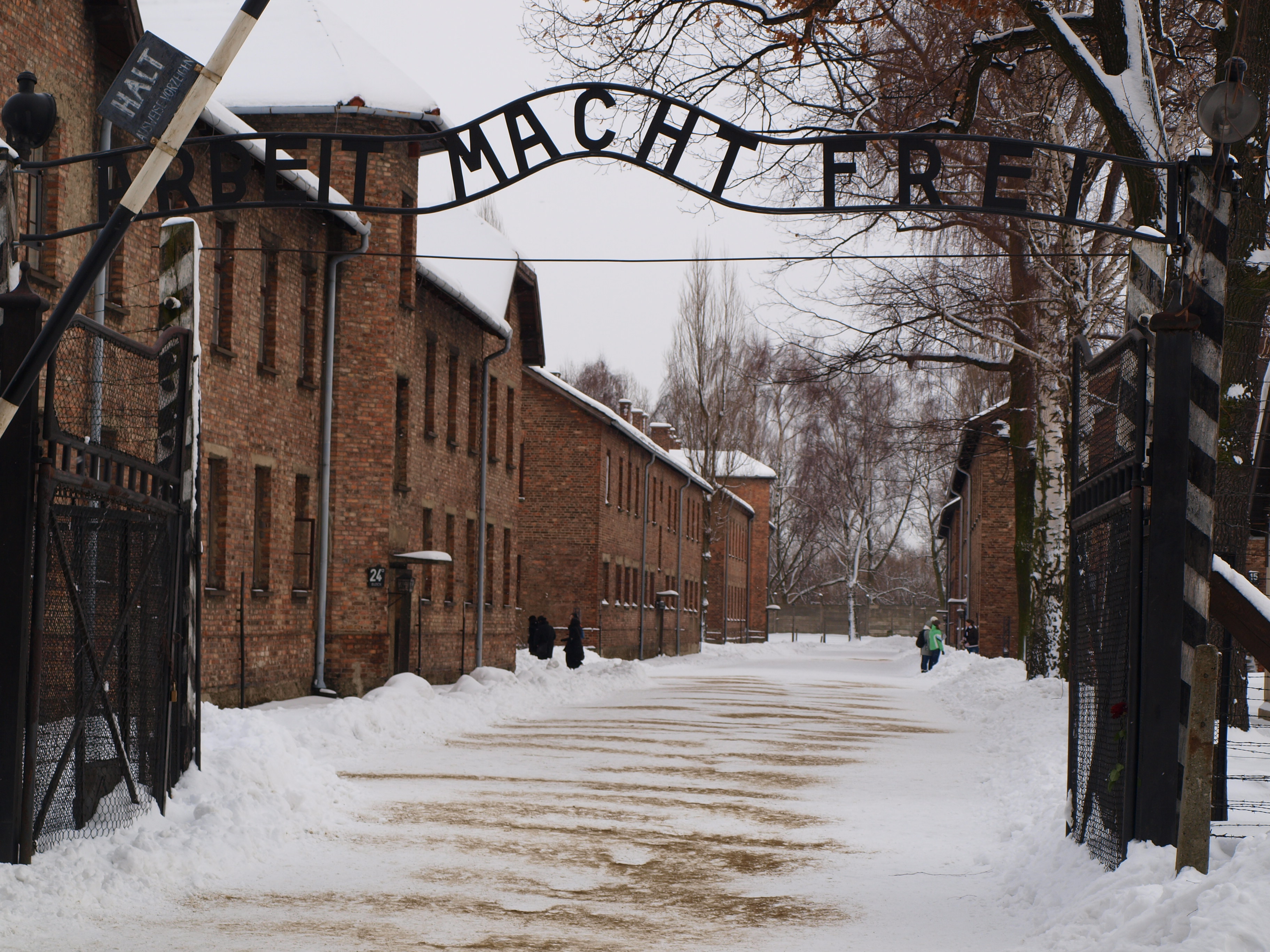
Auschwitz

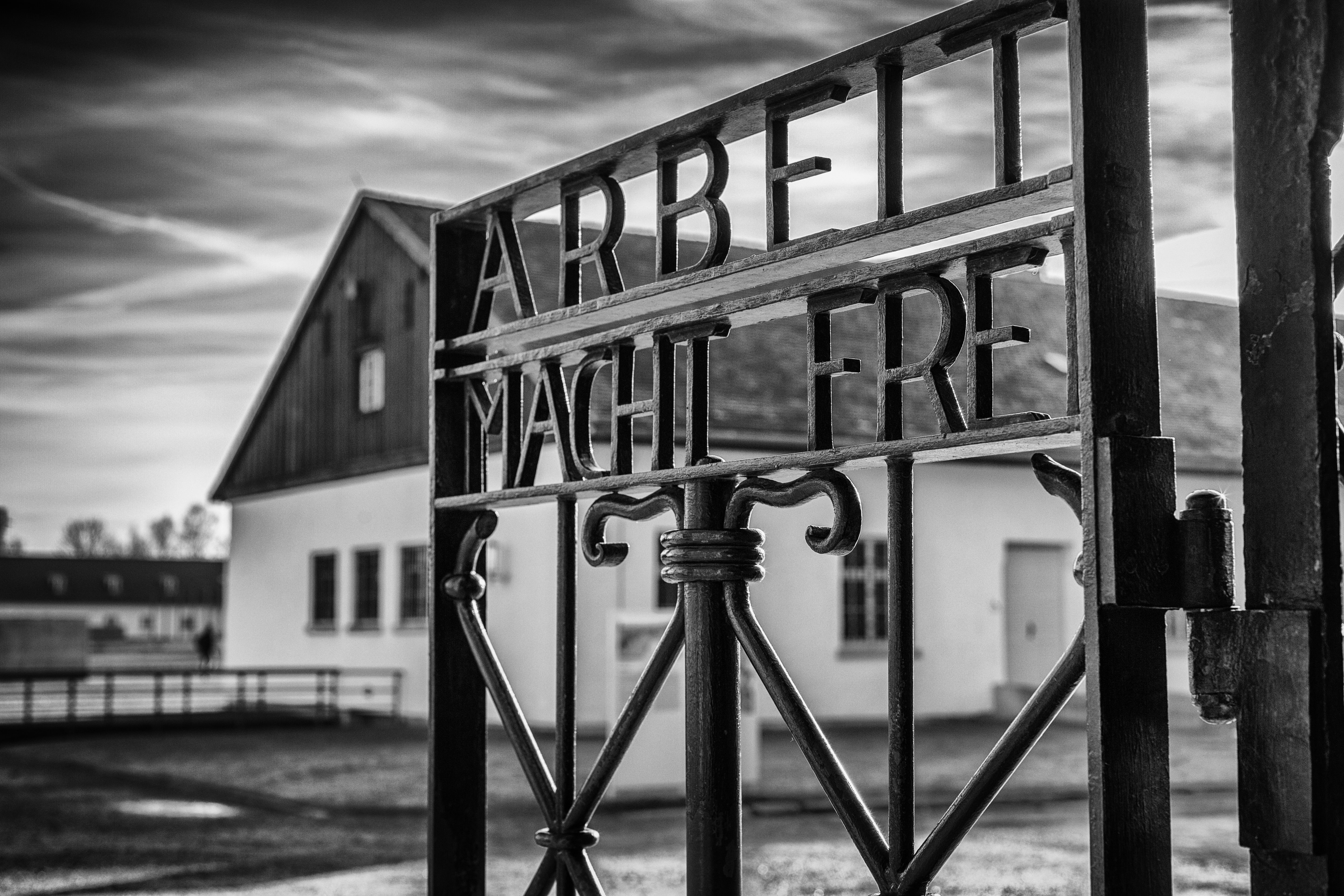
Dachau

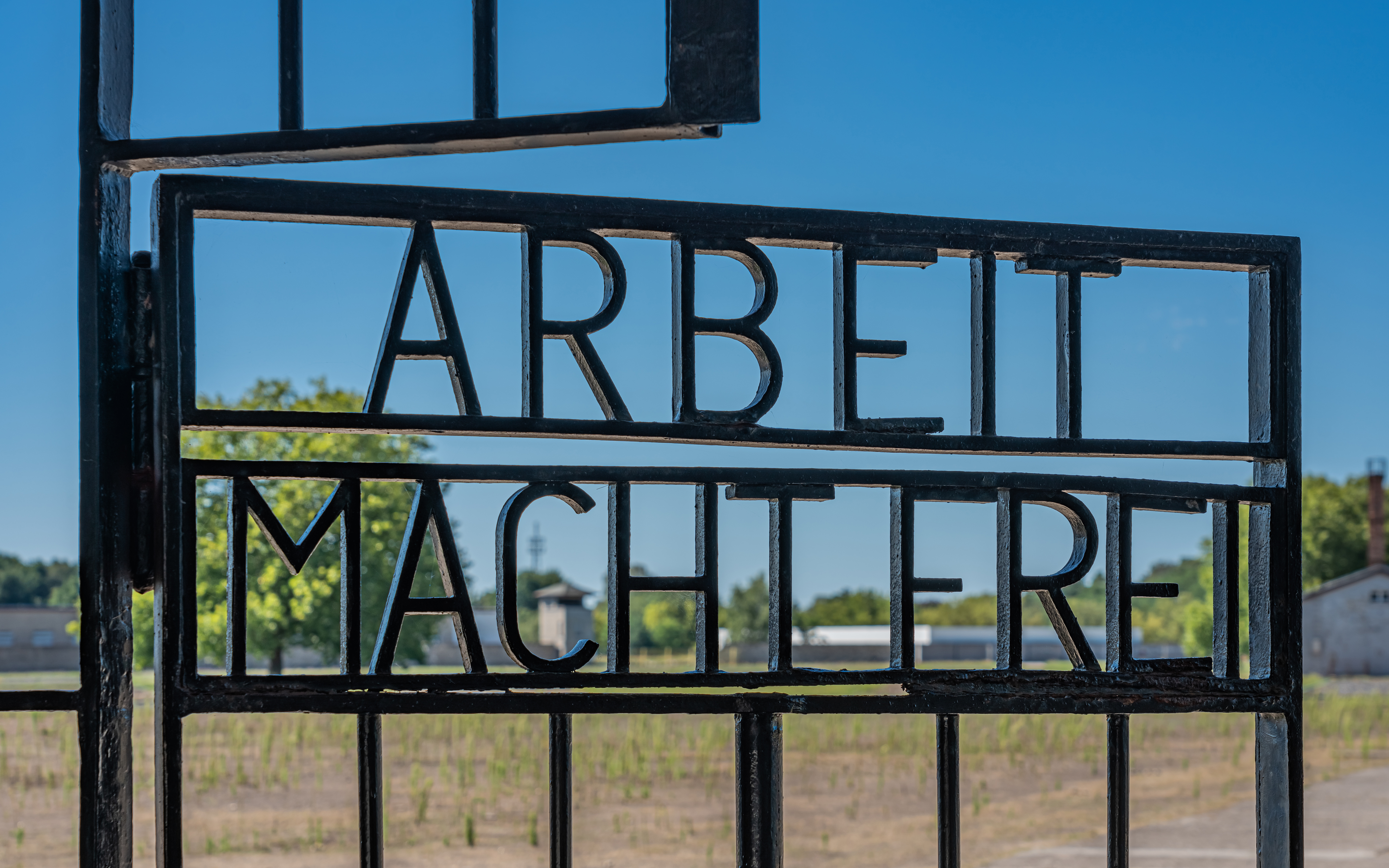
Sachsenhausen

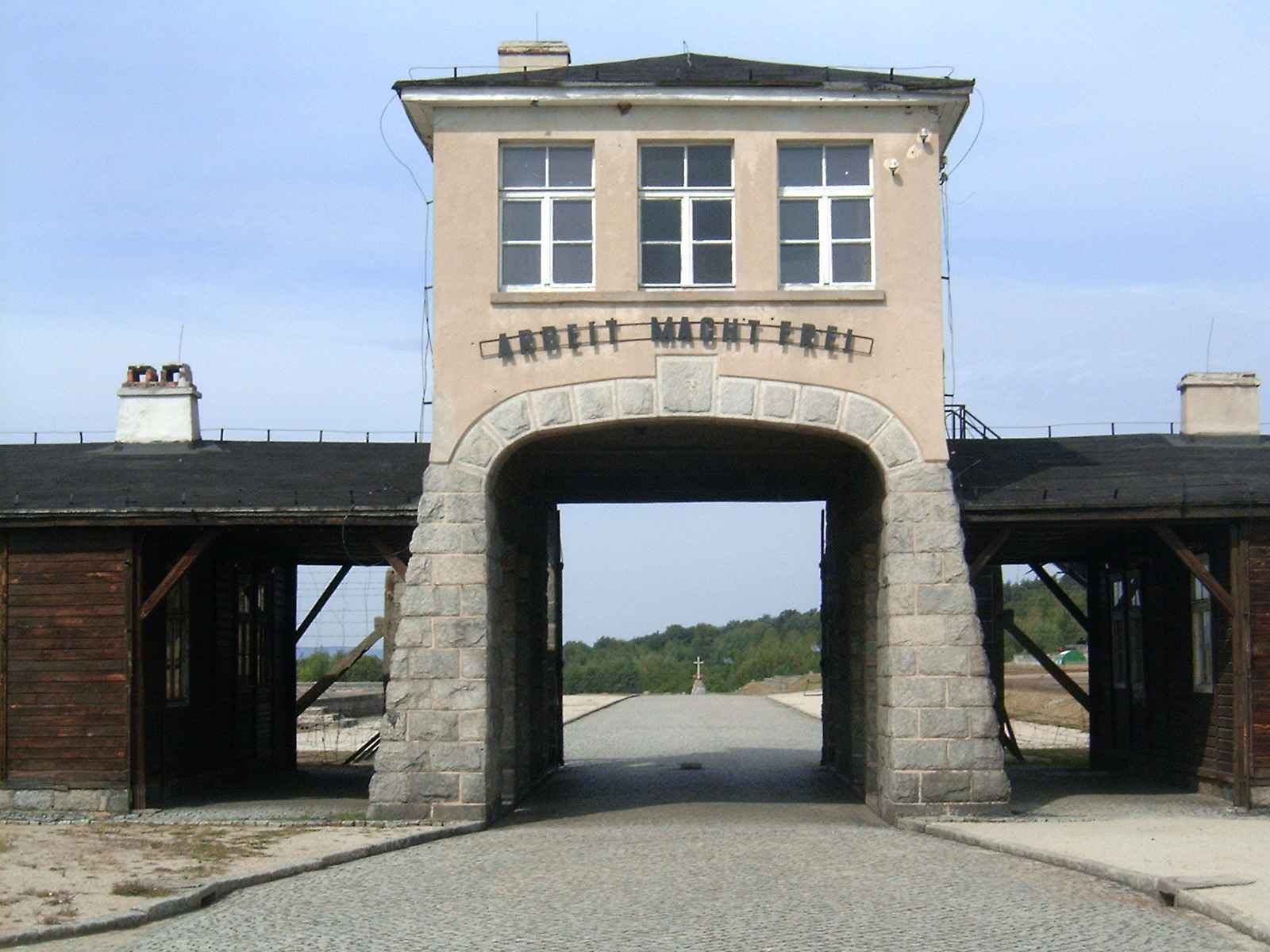
Gross-Rosen

Arbeit macht frei ([ˈaʁbaɪt ˈmaxt ˈfʁaɪ]) is a German phrase translated as "Work makes [one] free" or, more idiomatically, "Work sets you free" or "Work liberates".

The phrase originates from the title of an 1873 novel by Lorenz Diefenbach and alludes to John 8:31–32. Following the Nazi Party's rise to power in 1933, the phrase became a slogan used in programs implemented to combat mass unemployment in Germany.

It is primarily known for its use above the entrance of Auschwitz and other Nazi concentration camps. Because prisoners performed forced labor under horrific conditions, the word "free" took on a double meaning: the only way for prisoners to gain a sort of freedom was to work until they died.

== Origin ==
The expression comes from the title of an 1873 novel by the German philologist Lorenz Diefenbach, Arbeit macht frei: Erzählung von Lorenz Diefenbach, in which gamblers and fraudsters find the path to virtue through labour. "The truth will set you free" (Vēritās līberābit vōs) is a statement of Jesus found in John 8:32—"And ye shall know the truth and the truth shall make you free" (KJV).

The phrase was also used in French (le travail rend libre!) by Auguste Forel, a Swiss entomologist, neuroanatomist and psychiatrist, in his Fourmis de la Suisse (English: Ants of Switzerland) (1920). In 1922, the Deutsche Schulverein of Vienna, an ethnic nationalist "protective" organization of Germans within Austria, printed membership stamps with the phrase Arbeit macht frei.

The phrase is also evocative of the medieval German principle of Stadtluft macht frei ("urban air makes you free"), according to which serfs were liberated after being a city resident for one year and one day.

== Use by the Nazis ==
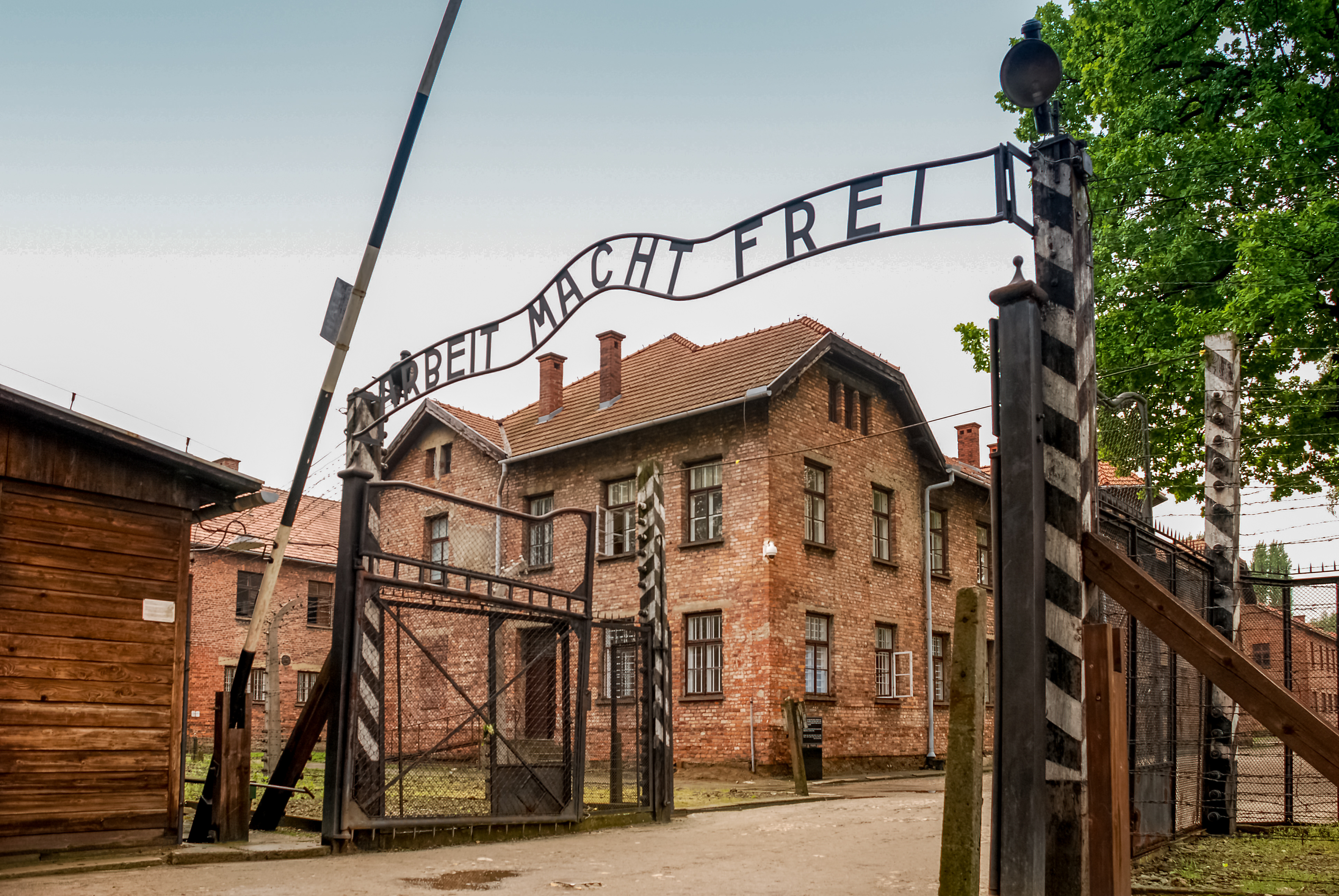
Gate at Auschwitz from side, showing the upside down "B" in "Arbeit"

The slogan Arbeit macht frei was first used over the gate of the Oranienburg concentration camp, which was set up in an abandoned brewery in March 1933 (it was later rebuilt in 1936 as Sachsenhausen).

The slogan's use was part of the 1937–1938 reconstruction by Schutzstaffel (SS) officer Theodor Eicke at Dachau concentration camp. From Dachau, it was copied by the Nazi officer Rudolf Höss, who had previously worked there. Höss was appointed to create the original camp at Auschwitz, which became known as Auschwitz (or Camp) 1 and whose intended purpose was to incarcerate Polish political detainees.

The Auschwitz I sign was made by prisoner-laborers including master blacksmith Jan Liwacz, and features an upside-down 'B', which has been interpreted as an act of defiance by the prisoners who made it.

In The Kingdom of Auschwitz, Otto Friedrich wrote about Rudolf Höss, regarding his decision to display the motto so prominently at Auschwitz:

He seems not to have intended it as a mockery, nor even to have intended it literally, as a false promise that those who worked to exhaustion would eventually be released, but rather as a kind of mystical declaration that self-sacrifice in the form of endless labor does in itself bring a kind of spiritual freedom.

In 1938, the Austrian political cabaret writer Jura Soyfer and the composer Herbert Zipper, while prisoners at Dachau, wrote the Dachaulied or "The Dachau Song". They had spent weeks marching in and out of the camp's gate to daily forced labour, and considered the motto Arbeit macht frei over the gate an insult. The song repeats the phrase cynically as a "lesson" taught by Dachau.

An example of ridiculing the slogan was a popular saying used among Auschwitz prisoners:

Arbeit macht frei
durch Krematorium Nummer drei.

Translation:

Work makes you free
Through crematorium number three.

It can also be seen at the Gross-Rosen and Theresienstadt camps, as well as at Fort Breendonk in Belgium. At the Monowitz camp (also known as Auschwitz III), the slogan was reportedly placed over the entrance gates. However, Primo Levi describes seeing the words illuminated over a doorway (as distinct from a gate). The slogan appeared at the Flossenbürg camp on the left gate post at the camp entry. The original gate posts survive in another part of the camp, but the sign no longer exists.

The signs are prominently displayed, and were seen by all prisoners and staff – all of whom knew, suspected, or quickly learned that prisoners confined there would likely only be freed by death. The signs' psychological impact was tremendous.

== Thefts of Arbeit macht frei signs ==
The Arbeit macht frei sign over the Auschwitz I gate was stolen in December 2009 and later recovered by authorities in three pieces. Anders Högström, a Swedish adherent of neo-Nazism, and five Polish men were jailed as a result. The original sign is now in storage at the Auschwitz-Birkenau State Museum and a replica was put over the gate in its place.

On 2 November 2014, the sign over the Dachau gate was stolen. It was found on 28 November 2016 under a tarp at a parking lot in Ytre Arna, a settlement north of Bergen, Norway's second-largest city.

== See also ==
- Extermination through labour
- Jedem das Seine (idiomatically, "everyone gets what he deserves"), a motto used at the Buchenwald concentration camp.
- Abandon all freedom consciously when entering the yard
