= Floating population =

Group of residents outside an official census count

The floating population refers to people who reside within a given population for a specific duration and for various reasons, but are not generally considered part of the official census count.

A population is usually broken down into two categories—the residents, who permanently stay in an area for a considerable amount of time and are part of the official population count, and the floating types, who are in the area but do not live there permanently and are not considered part of the official census count.

The resident population of a city can be further classified into two groups, those who permanently resides in a city for a considerably long duration of time like ten to fifteen years, and others, such as hostel students and transferable government servants, who might live for two to three years in a given area, as per their requirements, but are replaced by an equal number of new population for the same purpose after their departure. Thus, at any given time the number of people under this category remains more or less the same. The floating population, on the other hand, of a city consists of two types. The first category includes individuals who visit a place regularly but do not stay in that area permanently or long enough to be considered official, like any person working in a city for a short-time job. The second type consists of visitors or guests who might live for a small span of time, but their time of stay and their next visit are not predictable, like tourists and seasonal visitors.
