= Lorenz Diefenbach =

German philologist and lexicographer (1806–1883)

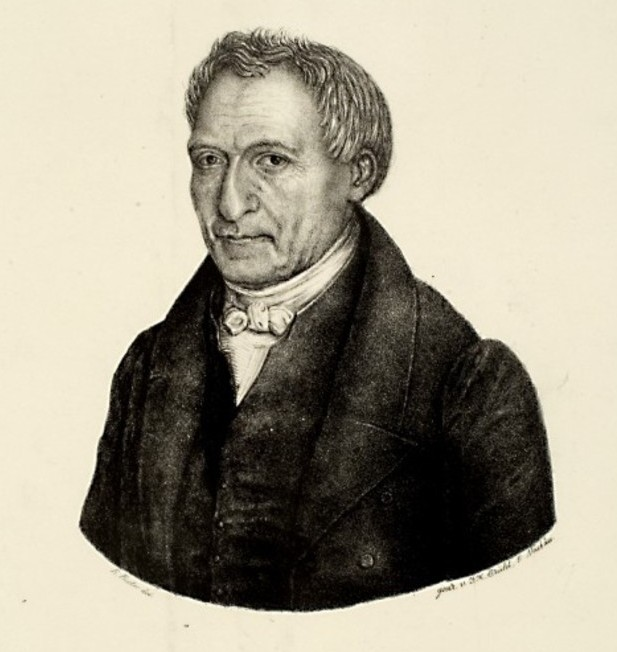
- Born: Georg Anton Lorenz Diefenbach; 19 July 1806; Ostheim, Hesse-Darmstadt, Holy Roman Empire
- Died: 28 March 1883 (aged 76); Darmstadt, Hesse, German Empire
- Occupations: philologist, lexicographer, novelist, pastor and librarian

Georg Anton Lorenz Diefenbach (19 July 1806, Ostheim, Landgraviate of Hesse-Darmstadt – 28 March 1883, Darmstadt) was a German philologist and lexicographer, as well as a novelist associated with the German nationalist movement. By career he was a pastor, like his father, and a librarian.

== Biography ==
For 12 years, he was a pastor and librarian at Solms-Laubach. In 1848, he settled at Frankfurt, where in 1865 he was appointed second librarian to the city.

In the twentieth century, Diefenbach became best known through his popular novel Die Wahrheit macht frei, a subsection of which, Arbeit macht frei, was later adopted as a slogan by various German and Austrian institutions, and most notoriously by the Nazis. The novel was published in Bremen in 1873 (following a preprint in a Viennese newspaper the previous year). The main hero is a gambler and fraudster who, through regular employment, succeeds in regaining the path of virtue. The title echoes John 8:32 from the Bible "and the truth shall make you free".

Diefenbach’s most enduring legacy lies in his numerous academic writings on philology and comparative linguistics, notably his studies in Latin, German dialects and Celtic languages. His lexicographical works, in particular his Latin–German glossaries are still cited in scholarship today. Much of the content of his Glossarium Latino-Germanicum was incorporated into revised editions of the Glossarium ad scriptores mediae et infimae latinitatis of Charles du Fresne, sieur du Cange. He also wrote poetry.

He became a member of the Prussian Academy of Sciences and was a friend of Jacob Grimm.

== Selected works ==
- Celtica. Sprachliche Documente zur Geschichte der Kelten (Stuttgart 1839–40), 2 vols.
- Vergleichendes Wörterbuch der gotischen Sprache: Lexicon comparativum linguarum indogermanicarum. (Vergleichendes Wörterbuch der germanischen Sprachen: und ihrer sämtlichen Stammverwandten mit besonderer Berücksichtigung der romanischen, lithauisch-slavischen und keltischen Sprachen und mit Zuziehung der finnischen Familie) (Frankfurt am Main 1851), 2 vols.
- Glossarium Latino-Germanicum mediae et infimae aetatis (Frankfurt am Main 1857; repr. Darmstadt 1997)
- Novum glossarium latino-germanicum: mediae et infimae aetatis; Beiträge zur wissenschaftlichen Kunde der neulateinischen und der germanischen Sprachen (Frankfurt am Main 1867; repr. Aalen 1964)
- Arbeit macht frei: Erzählung von Lorenz Diefenbach (1873)
