= Marxist view of journalism =

Chinese Communist Party slogan

The Marxist view of journalism (Chinese: 马克思主义新闻观; pinyin: Mǎkèsīzhǔyì xīnwénguān) is a political slogan used by the Chinese Communist Party (CCP) to describe governing journalism and journalists according to its ideology.

== History ==
Per the CCP's official historiography, the Neue Rheinische Zeitung founded by Karl Marx on 1 June 1848 was "the world’s first Marxist newspaper". The concept was articulated in 2013. In June 2023, the All-China Journalist's Association released a new mobile app designed to facilitate the training and licensing of journalists, which included more than 220 separate courses in the Marxist view of journalism.

== Concept ==
The CCP officially says that Karl Marx and Friedrich Engels viewed communist newspapers and periodicals as "important ideological weapons and political positions of the Party". The Marxist view of journalism requires news media to maintain a "correct political direction" and "emphasise positive propaganda". It involves three fundamental assertions:

1. The support of the basic principle of Party control of the media
2. The criticism of the "bourgeois concept of free speech"
3. Maintaining correct "guidance of public opinion"

== See also ==
- Mass media in China
- Public opinion struggle
- Censorship in China
