= Freedom of the press in China =

In the People's Republic of China, the 1982 constitution formally guarantees "freedom of speech [and] of the press" which the government, in practice, routinely violates with total impunity, according to Reporters Without Borders.

Authorities often label independent or investigative coverage as "fake news". Since Xi Jinping became the general secretary of the Chinese Communist Party (CCP) in 2012, various commentators, protesters, feminists, lawyers, journalists, and activists have been arrested, detained, jailed, and threatened for attempting to exercise press freedom. The 2020 World Press Freedom Index states that China is trying to establish a "new world media order" and maintain a system of information hyper-control, which the report says had negative effects for the entire world during the coronavirus public health crisis. As of 2023, Reporters Without Borders called China "the world's largest jailer of journalists."

== Background ==
The country's constitution prohibits media workers, including internet users, from publishing, writing, circulating, or otherwise posting fake news, misinformation, disinformation, and propaganda related to various subjects such as national security, terrorism, ethnic hatred, violence, and obscenity. However, most private journalists are restricted from sharing certain views and opinions with the general public.

China introduced Article 35 of the constitution of China that provides its citizens the right to observe "press freedom" in a free environment. However, Article 51 prohibits such activities for the national interest, which limits press freedom in the country. Chinese mass media such as radio and television broadcast news fall under Article 25, which limits their ability to broadcast plays, news, and other forms of information in free journalism standards. This, according to the Regulation on the Administration of Publishing, prevents transmitting of such content that poses risks to sovereignty and public interest.

Freedom of the Press in China was greatest during the early period (1966–1968) of the Cultural Revolution. During this period, several Red Guard organizations also operated independent printing presses to publish newspapers, articles, speeches, and big-character posters. Michael Schoenhals writes that one of the most striking features of the Cultural Revolution is the spread of publications by "revolutionary mass organizations" in 1966 and 1967, reflecting a plurality of values and opinions in society at odds with conventional stereotypes about Red Guards.

Media organizations and its workers, explicitly, foreign media working within the country, "must" obtain a license before they engage in journalism compiled with standards which are regulated by the foreign affairs authority. Foreign media have limited access or freedom to attend press conferences of the National People's Congress. However, the law of China allows state-owned media with "free press", such as raising questions or concerns in the press conference. Domestically, all credentialled journalists must study Xi Jinping thought through the "Study Xi, Strengthen the Country propaganda application" in order for them to renew their press credentials. The app instructs journalists to "correctly guide public opinion."

== Global rank ==
As of 2023, the global rank of China declined to 179 out of 180, with only North Korea having less press freedom. China has been one of the countries with nominal freedom of press regulations. Reporters Without Borders, a non-government organization dedicated to safeguarding the right to information, published an annual report, the World Press Freedom Index, indicating that the Chinese Communist Party, the ruling party, is exercising self- and direct censorship on the press.

== Censorship ==
According to Reporters Without Borders, the role of the media in China is to impart state propaganda. According to the Committee to Protect Journalists, in 2023, China ranks as the "worst jailer of journalists," with Uyghurs making up almost half of all imprisoned journalists. China often blocks news websites, social media platforms, and other services such as Facebook, Gmail, Google, Instagram, and Pinterest, and has limited their access to the general public. The Great Firewall has blocked most foreign news websites, such as Voice of America, BBC News, The New York Times, and Bloomberg News. In 2017, Chinese authorities also removed about "300 politically sensitive articles" from the Cambridge University Press. However, this article removal was later contested online on Change.org. In 2019, some scholars and writers deleted their posts or permanently deleted their feeds after authorities asked them to do so. Some writers were warned for retweeting or liking posts.

Under Xi Jinping, press censorship has increased. The authorities often raid pro-democracy activists and media owners in an attempt to suppress the press. In 2019, China blocked all available versions of Wikipedia in the country without any notice to Wikimedia Foundation.

Chinese journalists are often detained for alleged negative coverage. In 2016, more than twenty journalists, including commentator Jia Jia, were arrested after an open letter was published calling on Chinese leader Xi Jinping to resign. According to Reporters without Borders, independent journalists and bloggers are often surveilled, harassed, detained, and, in some cases, tortured. A report published by the Committee to Protect Journalists in 2016 asserted that an estimated 49 journalists are serving prison terms, indicating that China is a "prolific jailer of media workers".

In 2020, activist and media mogul, Jimmy Lai, was arrested on accusations that he had used Apple Daily and conspired with six former executives of the news platform to produce "seditious publications" and colluding with "foreign forces." The platform was critical of Chinese and Hong Kong governments. In February 2026, he was sentenced to 20 years in prison. The Committee to Protect Journalists' Asia-Pacific director Beh Lih Yi called Lai's conviction "Hong Kong's most shameful act of persecution of journalists." The European Union's foreign affairs spokesperson stated that the union deplored Lai's prison sentence and urged the authorities to stop prosecuting journalists. Lai's co-defendants were sentenced to prison terms ranging from six years and three months to 10 years. Those convicted include publisher Cheung Kim-hung, associate publisher Chan Pui-man, editor-in-chief Ryan Law, executive editor-in-chief Lam Man-chung, executive editor-in-chief for English news Fung Wai-kong, and editorial writer Yeung Ching-kee.

In May 2026, Taiwan's Presidential Office criticized China for expelling New York Times correspondent Vivian Wang in February following an interview with President Lai Ching-te, showing concerns over press freedom and the treatment of international media.

In July 2026, the Foreign Correspondents' Club of China (FCCC) stated in its annual report that foreign journalists in China faced surveillance, official interference, visa-related issues, and other obstacles to reporting.

== See also ==
- Human rights in China
