= Politicians run the newspapers =

Chinese Communist Party slogan

The "politicians run the newspapers" (Chinese: 政治家办报; pinyin: Zhèngzhì jiābàn bào) is a policy and slogan of the Chinese Communist Party (CCP) to emphasize its control over the news media.

== History ==
The slogan was first put forward by Mao Zedong in 1957 during the Anti-Rightist Campaign. Mao said that "the writing of articles, and especially lead editorials, must be responsible to the overall interests of the party, united closely with the political situation," continuing by saying "this is what is meant by politicians running the newspapers". In 1959, he said "In doing news work, we must have politicians running the newspapers". This method became especially prominent during the Cultural Revolution, with the two newspapers and one journal system. The policy was downplayed in the 1980s during the reform and opening up.

In the 1990s, after the 1989 Tiananmen Square protests and massacre, the term reappeared under the leadership of CCP general secretary Jiang Zemin. During a visit to the People's Liberation Army Daily on 2 January 1996, Jiang said: "Mao Zedong once said that in doing media work we must ensure that the papers are run by politicians. This warning rings true even today." Similar terms were also introduced, such as "politicians running the websites", which came into prominence particularly after the 1999 crackdown on Falun Gong. CCP general secretary Xi Jinping has also emphasized the concept; at the Symposium on News Reporting and Public Opinion in February 2016, he said that "Party media takes the party's last name" and that "news and opinion workers must enhance their awareness of [the concept of] politicians running the newspaper".

== Policy ==
The policy requires media practitioners to view social events and engage in news work with the perspective of politicians, and to make news propaganda closely follow the domestic line and serve the overall interests of the Chinese Communist Party and the People's Republic of China.

== See also ==
- Censorship in China
- Public opinion guidance
- Public opinion struggle
