= Mass media in China =

The mass media in the People's Republic of China primarily consists of television, newspapers, radio, and magazines. Since the start of the 21st century, the Internet has also emerged as an important form of mass media and is under the direct supervision and control of the government of the People's Republic of China and the ruling Chinese Communist Party (CCP). Media in China is strictly controlled and censored by the CCP, with the main agency that oversees the nation's media being the Central Propaganda Department of the CCP. The largest media organizations, including the People's Daily, the Xinhua News Agency, and the China Media Group, are all controlled by the CCP.

Before the founding of the PRC in 1949, mass media in China was diverse, and less centralized. During the Republican era (1912–1949), the media played a big role in political discussion, intellectual debate, and cultural ideals. While censorship still was prevalent, the press landscape remained more varied than under Mao.

Since the founding of the People's Republic of China (PRC) in 1949 and until the 1980s, almost all media outlets in mainland China have been state-run. State media adheres to the concept of "politicians running the newspapers". Privately owned media outlets only began to emerge at the onset of the reform and opening up, although state media continue to hold a significant market share. All media continues to follow regulations imposed by the Central Propaganda Department of the CCP on subjects considered taboo by the CCP, including but not limited to the legitimacy of the party, pro-democracy movements, human rights in Tibet, the persecution of Uyghur people, pornography, and the banned religious topics, such as the Dalai Lama and Falun Gong. Under the general secretaryship of Xi Jinping, propaganda in media has become more prevalent and homogeneous. All journalists are required to study Xi Jinping Thought to maintain their press credentials. Hong Kong, which has maintained a separate media ecosystem from mainland China, is also witnessing increasing self-censorship.

Reporters Without Borders consistently ranks the PRC very poorly on media freedoms in their annual releases of the World Press Freedom Index, labeling the Chinese government as having "the sorry distinction of leading the world in repression of the Internet". As of 2025, the PRC ranked 178 out of 180 nations on the World Press Freedom Index.

== History ==
=== Under Mao ===
In both the Yan'an era of the 1930s and the early 1950s, the CCP encouraged grassroots journalism in the form of "worker-peasant correspondents," an idea originating from the Soviet Union.

In 1957, during the Anti-Rightist Campaign, Mao Zedong put forward the concept of "politicians running the newspapers". Mao said that "the writing of articles, and especially lead editorials, must be responsible to the overall interests of the party, united closely with the political situation," continuing by saying "this is what is meant by politicians running the newspapers".

During the early period (1966–1968) of the Cultural Revolution, freedom of the press in China was at its peak. Independent political groups could publish broadsheets and handbills, as well as leaders' speeches and meeting transcripts which would normally have been considered highly classified. During those years, several Red Guard organizations operated independent printing presses to publish newspapers, articles, speeches, and big-character posters. Media during this time was dominated by the Two Newspapers and One Journal, referring to the People's Daily, People's Liberation Army Daily and Red Flag.

Mobile film units brought Chinese cinema to the countryside and were crucial to the standardization and popularization of cultural during this period, particularly including revolutionary model operas. During the Cultural Revolution's early years, mobile film teams traveled to rural areas with news reels of Mao meeting with Red Guards and Tiananmen Square parades, where they were welcomed ceremoniously. These news reels became known as hong bao pian ("red treasure films"), analogous to how the Little Red Books were dubbed hong bao shu ("red treasure books").

=== Reform and opening up ===
Media controls were most relaxed during the 1980s under paramount leader Deng Xiaoping, until they were tightened in the aftermath of the 1989 Tiananmen Square protests and massacre. Journalists were active participants in the 1989 demonstrations that culminated in the massacre, which made it all but impossible to reconcile the growing desire of mainland Chinese journalists for control over their own profession with the CCP's interest in not letting that happen. There have even been occasional acts of open, outright defiance of the CCP, though these acts remain rare.

After Deng Xiaoping's 1992 southern tour, Chinese media became increasingly commercialized. Media controls were relaxed again under CCP general secretary Jiang Zemin in the late 1990s, but the growing influence of the Internet and its potential to encourage dissent led to heavier regulations again under CCP general secretary Hu Jintao. Non-governmental media outlets that were allowed to operate within China (excluding Hong Kong and Macau, which have separate media regulatory bodies) were no longer required to strictly follow every journalistic guideline set by the CCP.

In 1998, the State Administration of Radio, Film, and Television (SARFT) began the Connecting Every Village with Radio and TV Project, which extended radio and television broadcasting to every village in China. In the 1990s and early 2000s, the ways in which the CCP operated—especially the introduction of reforms aimed at decentralizing power—spurred a period of greater media autonomy in several ways:

- The growth of "peripheral"—local and some regional—media. This trend decentralized and dampened CCP oversight. In general, the greater the distance is between reporters and media outlets, and Beijing and important provincial capitals, the greater their leeway.
- A shift toward administrative and legal regulation of the media and away from more fluid and personal oversight. CCP efforts to rely on regulations rather than whim to try to control the media—as evidenced by the dozens of directives set forth when the State Press and Publications Administration was created in 1987, and by new regulations in 1990 and 1994—probably were intended to tighten CCP control, making it a matter of law rather than personal relationships. In fact, however, these regulations came at a time when official resources were being stretched more thinly and individual officials were becoming less willing—and less able—to enforce regulations.
- Vicissitudes of media acceptability. Since the early 1990s, the types of media coverage deemed acceptable by the regime have risen sharply. Growing uncertainties about what is permissible and what is out of bounds sometimes work to the media's interests. Often, however, these uncertainties encourage greater self-censorship among Chinese journalists and work to the benefit of the CCP's media control apparatus.

As state resources have become stretched more thinly, the media have found it far easier than before to print and broadcast material that falls within vaguely defined grey areas, though again, this uncertainty can also work to the advantage of the CCP.

In preparation for the 17th National Party Congress in 2007, new restrictions were placed on all sectors of the press, Internet-users, bloggers, website managers, and foreign journalists, more than 30 of whom have been arrested since the start of the year. In addition, a thousand discussion forums and websites have been shut down, and "a score of dissidents" have been imprisoned since July 2007.

In efforts to stem growing unrest in China, the propaganda chief of the State Council, Hua Qing, announced in the People's Daily that the government was drafting a new press law that would lessen government involvement in the news media. In the editorial, Hu Jintao was said to have visited the People's Daily offices and said that large-scale public incidents should be "accurately, objectively and uniformly reported, with no tardiness, deception, incompleteness or distortion". Reports by Chinese media at the time indicated a gradual release from CCP control. For example, the detention of anti-government petitioners placed in mental institutions was reported in a state newspaper, later criticized in an editorial by the English-language China Daily. At the time, scholars and journalists believed that such reports were a small sign of opening up in the media.

=== Under Xi Jinping ===
Since Xi Jinping became in 2012 the CCP general secretary, censorship has been significantly stepped up. Under his general secretaryship, propaganda has become more prevalent and homogeneous in media. In 2016, Xi visited the Symposium on News Reporting and Public Opinion, where he stated that "party-owned media must hold the family name of the party" and that the state media "must embody the party's will, safeguard the party's authority". Under Xi, investigative journalism has been driven almost to extinction within China. According to the Committee to Protect Journalists, in 2023, China ranks as the "worst jailer of journalists," with Uyghurs making up almost half of all imprisoned journalists.

In 2018, as part of an overhaul of the CCP and government bodies, the State Administration of Press, Publication, Radio, Film and Television (SAPPRFT) was renamed into the National Radio and Television Administration (NRTA) with its film, news media and publications being transferred to the Central Propaganda Department. Additionally, the control of China Central Television (CCTV, including its international edition, China Global Television), China National Radio (CNR) and China Radio International (CRI) was transferred to the newly established China Media Group (CMG) under the control of the Central Propaganda Department. The same year, provinces and cities began to establish international communication centers.

In 2019, the All-China Journalists Association updated its code of ethics and mandatory exam requiring journalists to be guided by Xi Jinping Thought. In September 2021, the NRTA prohibited broadcasters from displaying what it termed "sissy men and other abnormal aesthetics." In October 2021, the National Development and Reform Commission published rules restricting private capital in "news-gathering, editing, broadcasting, and distribution."

In 2020, the Foreign Correspondents' Club of China stated that China used coronavirus prevention measures, intimidation and visa curbs to limit foreign reporting. According to Radio Free Asia, in December 2022, the National Press and Publication Administration issued a directive stating that in order to obtain credentials as a professional journalist, they must pass a national exam and "...must support the leadership of the Communist Party of China, conscientiously study, publicize and implement Xi Jinping's thoughts on the new era of socialism with Chinese characteristics, resolutely implement the party's theory, line, principles and policies, and adhere to the correct political direction and public opinion guidance." With greater online censorship, occurrences of "news extortion," in which journalists demand hush money for negative stories to not be published, have grown.

Domestically, all journalists must study Xi Jinping Thought through the Xuexi Qiangguo app in order for them to renew their press credentials. Journalists are instructed to "correctly guide public opinion." In the 2020s, state media outlets have increasingly created "media studios" focused on foreign "public opinion guidance" and run by small teams that obscure state or party ownership.

== Forms of media ==
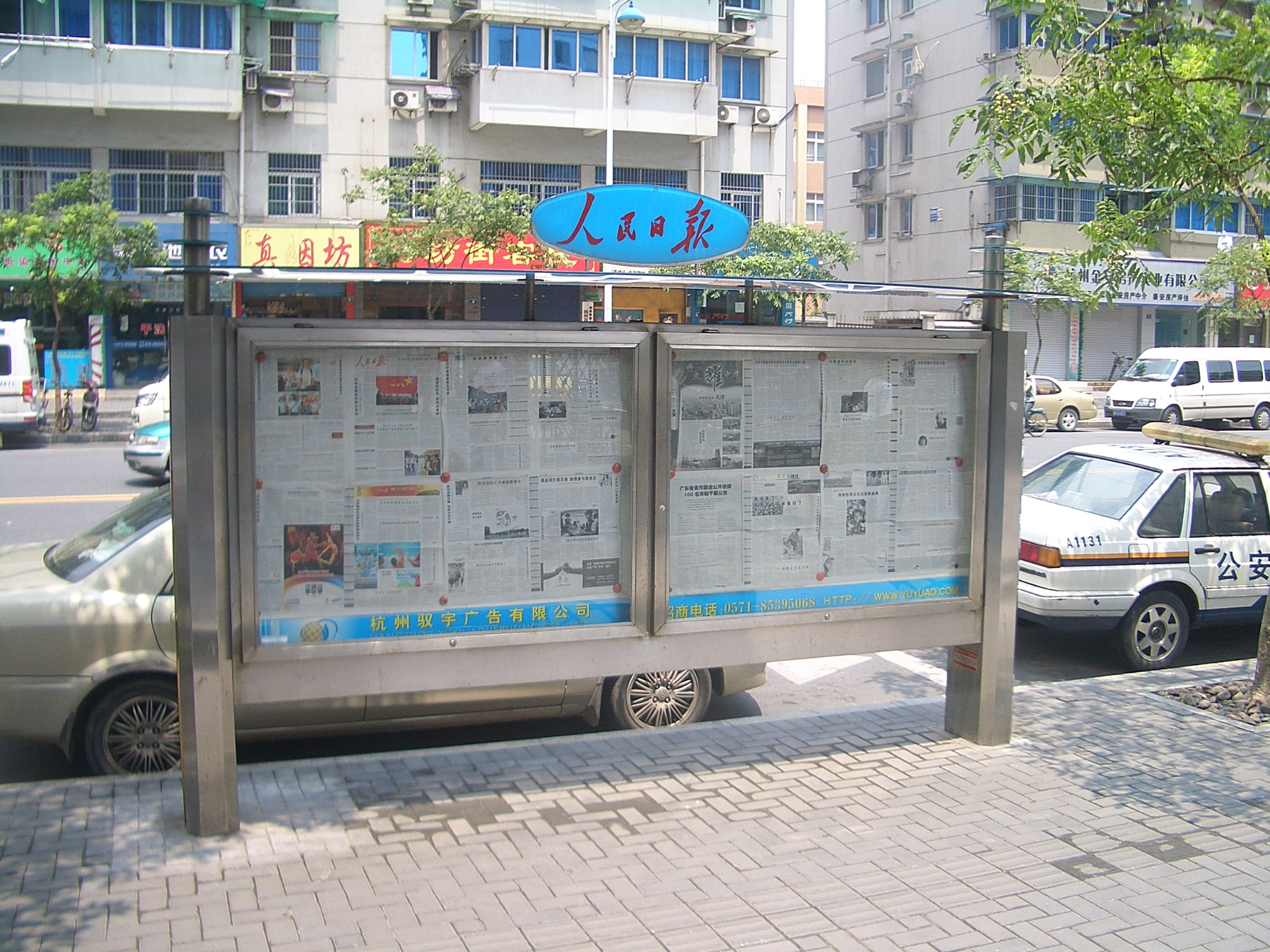
A current issue of Renmin Ribao posted on a newspaper display board in Hangzhou

=== Newspapers and journals ===
==== Historical ====
The Peking Gazette was an official government journal published during the Qing dynasty, and it played a vital role in bureaucratic communication and information dissemination. In addition to publishing imperial edicts and official appointments, the Peking Gazette was used to share information about court affairs, legal cases, and administrative decisions across the empire. By distributing the same information to officials in different regions, the gazette helped create a more uniform understanding of government policy and imperial authority. Information from the gazette was often copied, summarized, or read aloud locally, allowing it to reach people beyond those who directly purchased it. Over time, during the Qing dynasty, accessibility to the gazettes grew from only relative elites being able to purchase, to readers with casual interest. Gazettes were published by the government and spread to different provinces to create centralized control. As a result, gazettes began to be interpreted as "symbols of national legitimacy and tools of public instruction."

==== People's Republic of China ====
During the early period of the Cultural Revolution, the number of newspapers declined while independent publications by mass political organizations grew. Mao encouraged these independent publications. According to the National Bureau of Statistics, the number of newspapers dropped from 343 in 1965 to 49 in 1966, and then to a 20th-century low of 43 in 1967. At the same time, the number of publications by mass organizations such as Red Guards grew to an estimated number as high as 10,000.

The number of newspapers in mainland China has increased from 43—virtually all CCP newspapers—in 1968 to 382 in 1980 and more than 2,200 today. By one official estimate, there are now more than 7,000 magazines and journals in the country. The number of copies of daily and weekly newspapers and magazines in circulation grew fourfold between the mid-1960s and the mid-to-late 1980s, reaching 310 million by 1987.

The diversity in mainland Chinese media is partly because most state media outlets no longer receive heavy subsidies from the government, and are expected to cover their expenses through commercial advertising. State-owned newspapers which are "commercialized" or "market-oriented" (meaning that they rely on advertising revenues and retail sales) also have greater latitude in their content. Bribery of reporters for positive coverage is not uncommon.

=== Cinema ===
Cinema in the PRC expanded from under 600 movie theaters to about 162,000 projection units from 1949 to 1983. Mobile screening units would project films outdoors in rural areas, helping the CCP unite and mobilize the population. However, audiences were not just passive recipients of the propaganda, they experienced cinema through all five senses. Sight, taste, smell, sound, and touch created a multisensory atmosphere that shaped reception of the films as much as the films themselves. The energy and noise from the crowds, the unpredictable weather, and the "hot noise" challenged notions of direct CCP control through propaganda films.

During the 1960s, a film shortage led to a large amount of films from Hong Kong to be imported to Shanghai. These films gained popularity and were seen as "humorous" and "lively." Many citizens of Shanghai who watched these films believed that life in Hong Kong was better than in Shanghai, and the CCP viewed this as a threat to social order. They feared a shift towards Western attitudes that were shown in these films, as well as economic and security disruptions due to intense crowds. In that sense, film culture during this time period was often a rejection of centralized authority and state culture. Historian Matthew Johnson in Beneath the Propaganda State describes how Shanghai had both official and unofficial cultural landscapes. There were "gaps" and "workarounds" in the system, and sometimes foreign or non-ideological works slipped in.

=== Radio ===
During the Second Sino-Japanese War (1937–1945), the CCP set up a network of radios to spread news and propaganda starting from its base in Yan'an. The Yan'an station, which was established in 1941, was strictly reliant on women trained to broadcast and work with radios, with no men employed as broadcasters until 1946. The programs were transcribed by "radio monitors" who then printed out large fliers and blackboard newspapers to spread throughout rural communities.

The CCP radio system was built upon an already existing network of Nationalist "radio newspapers." When the CCP took over areas with this network, they reused or recreated the equipment and set up to spread their own news and propaganda. The CCP also used equipment inherited by the Japanese stations after they surrendered in 1945 and left behind many stations and transmitters. These reused stations, equipment, transmitters, etc., became the foundation of China's national radio station once the People's Republic of China built its own media institutions in 1949.

In the era of Mao (1949–1976), radio listening was a communal or public activity. Radio was often a collective experience via loudspeakers, work units, villages, and dedicated gathering spaces. Listening to the radio was often seen as a political obligation in ways because community listening events were organized by local officials or sound-reception officers. These mass "listening sessions" were extremely popular because radios were not widely available for personal ownership. After radios became more widely produced and cheaper, the general public increasingly shifted to more private and domestic settings for listening to the radio.

After the reform era (post-1978), radio shifted formats to include personal, consumerist, and informational broadcasts rather than strictly political ones.

As of 1997, there were over 100 talk radio stations throughout the Shanghai area.

=== Internet ===
China has the largest number of internet users in the world, as of at least 2022. The internet in China is heavily censored with limitations on public access to international media and non-sanctioned Chinese media. The main bodies for internet control are the Central Cyberspace Affairs Commission, a CCP body established in 2014, and the Cyberspace Administration of China, which is under the Cyberspace Affairs Commission. Additionally, the Ministry of Public Security's Cyber Police force is responsible for internal security, regulating online content, and investigating Internet fraud, scams, pornography, separatism, and extremism.

The state's control over the internet is known as the Great Firewall of China. The Great Firewall prevents Chinese citizens from accessing foreign websites. Users seeking to circumvent the firewall might use virtual private networks (VPNs) or proxy services, but authorities have repeatedly intervened to restrict or shut down this loophole.

In the spring of 2015, Beijing launched a sister system of censorship to the Great Firewall, the Great Cannon. Unlike the Great Firewall, which blocks traffic as it enters or exits China, the Great Cannon can adjust and replace the content traveling around the internet. It intercepts, then modifies and redirects web traffic. The Cannon hijacks web traffic by implanting corrupt scripts into activity on websites like Baidu, China's search engine, exploiting traffic.

=== Satellite receivers ===
The administration of satellite receivers falls under the jurisdiction of the National Radio and Television Administration, which stipulates that foreign satellite television channels may only be received at high-end hotels and the homes and workplaces of foreigners. Foreign satellite television channels may seek approval to broadcast, but must be "friendly toward China." Foreign television news channels are, in theory, ineligible for distribution in China.

Home satellite dishes are officially illegal. Black market satellite dishes are nonetheless prolific, numbering well into the tens of millions. Chinese authorities engage in regular crackdowns to confiscate and dismantle illicit dishes, expressing concerns both over the potential for copyright infringements and over their ability receive "reactionary propaganda."

=== CCP internal media ===
Much of the information collected by the Chinese mainstream media is published in neicans (internal, limited circulation reports prepared for the high-ranking government officials), not in the public outlets. He Qinglian documents in Media Control in China that there are many grades and types of internal documents [neibu wenjian 内部文件]. Many are restricted to a certain level of official – such as county level, provincial level or down to a certain level of official in a ministry. Some Chinese journalists, including Xinhua correspondents in foreign countries, write for both the mass media and the internal media. The level of classification is tied to the administrative levels of CCP and government in China. The higher the administrative level of the issuing office, generally the more secret the document is. In local government the issuing grades are province [sheng 省], region (or city directly subordinate to a province) [diqu 地区or shengzhixiashi 省直辖市] and county [xian 县]; grades within government organs are ministry [bu 部], bureau [ju 局] and office [chu 处]; in the military corps [jun 军], division [shi 师], and regiment [tuan 团]. The most authoritative documents are drafted by the CCP Central Committee to convey instructions from CCP leaders. Documents with Chinese Communist Party Central Committee Document [Zhonggong Zhongyang Wenjian 中共中央文件] at the top in red letters are the most authoritative.

=== Foreign media and journalists ===
China does not issue licenses to foreign companies to publish magazines or newspapers directly. Instead, it permits numerous "copyright cooperation" (or syndication) agreements between state-owned media entities and foreign partners. In these arrangements, a state-owned company effectively leases its publishing license to a foreign partner like Conde Nast, which then transforms the magazine into a Chinese edition of publications like Vogue, GQ and Rolling Stone that the two entities copublish together. These titles subsequently undergo rigorous regulatory approval in order to get their partnership renewed. In 2006, the General Administration of Press and Publication halted the approval of new foreign magazines on non-science and technology topics.

In 2012, China banned Al Jazeera English and expelled their foreign staff due to an unfavorable report about forced labor. This was the first time since 1998 that China had expelled a major foreign media organization.

Since 2016, foreign-owned media outlets have not been allowed to publish online in China, and online sale of foreign media is regulated to prevent content that may "endanger national security or cause social unrest".

Reporting in China has become more difficult with the Chinese government increasingly interfering in the work of foreign journalists and discouraging Chinese citizens from giving interviews to the foreign press. The Chinese government increasingly uses restrictions and harassment of foreign journalists as a way to punish their home country or the home country of the media organization they report for. Since 2018, none of the 150 correspondents and bureau chiefs surveyed annually by the Foreign Correspondents' Club of China (FCCC) have reported an improvement in their working conditions.

In 2020, the Chinese government expelled or forced the departure of at least 20 journalists. The Committee to Protect Journalists said of the behavior "It's very disreputable for China, and it also shows that they have a lot to hide."

To foreign journalists working in China, the ruling CCP has threatened and punished them by failing to renew their credentials when they criticize the CCP's policies and human rights abuses. In March 2020, Chinese officials expelled almost all American journalists from China, accusing them and the US of trying to "impose American values" in China.

In August 2020, China detained Cheng Lei, an Australian journalist working for China Global Television Network, a Chinese state-run English television news channel, amid souring relations with Australia. Following her arrest the only other two Australian journalists in China were placed under exit bans and only managed to leave the country with their families after the Australian authorities interceded on their behalf.

In December 2020, Chinese authorities detained Haze Fan, who works for the Bloomberg News bureau in Beijing, on suspicion of "endangering national security".

In April 2021, BBC journalist John Sudworth and his family were forced to flee mainland China for the island of Taiwan after personal attacks and disinformation from the Chinese government put them in danger. His wife is a journalist with the Irish RTÉ. The Chinese government had been angered by reporting he did on the internment camps in Xinjiang as well as a larger BBC story about forced labor in Xinjiang's cotton industry.

=== Citizen journalism ===
Citizen journalism has created much change and influence within Chinese media and society in which its online activity is very much controlled. The interconnection built from citizen journalism and mainstream journalism in China has allotted politically and socially charged information to be distributed to promote progressive changes and serves as national sentiments. In doing so, the mass public of China has the opportunities to move around the controlled and monitored online presence and the information it contains.

Citizen journalists face many repercussions when unpackaging the truth and reach domestic and global audiences. Most if not all of these repercussions result from government officials and law enforcement from the journalists respective countries. Citizen journalists are needed and depended on by the mass public but are viewed as an imminent threat to their governments. The public has had the resources to pursue this level of journalism from their surroundings and based on real life perspectives that lack censorship and influence from a higher entity. The various forms citizen journalism is formed has outdated many news and media sources as result of the authentic approach citizen journalists carry out.

During the 2019–20 Hong Kong protests, fraudulent pictures encouraging people to pose as reporters and abuse freedom of press regulations to obstruct the police were widely circulated on social media with the aim to discredit citizen journalists.

In the context of China and the national pandemic rooted from the coronavirus, many voices were censored and limited when it came to citizen journalists. This occurred in the process of visually and vocally documenting the social climate of China in regards to the coronavirus. For instance, a Chinese citizen journalist posted videos of Wuhan, China as the outbreak had been spreading globally. As a result, the journalist was stopped and detained by the police and was not released for two months. In sharing their experience being detained after being released the tone it was expressed in was marketed. This citizen journalist experience is one amongst more of who were similarly detained and censored.

== Communist Party control ==
Media in China adheres to the concept of "politicians running the newspapers". The media and communications industry in mainland China is controlled by the Central Propaganda Department of the CCP. The principal mechanism to force media outlets to comply with the CCP's requests is the vertically organized nomenklatura system of cadre appointments, and includes those in charge of the media industry. The CCP utilizes a wide variety of tools to maintain control over news reporting including "direct ownership, accreditation of journalists, harsh penalties for online criticism, and daily directives to media outlets and websites that guide coverage of breaking news stories." National Radio and Television Administration oversees the administration of state-owned enterprises involved in the radio and television, reporting directly to the Central Propaganda Department.

The Central Propaganda Department directly controls the China Media Group, which includes the China Central Television (including China Global Television), China National Radio (CNR) and China Radio International (CRI). The department also owns China Daily, as well as controlling many other media-related organizations such as the China International Publishing Group. China News Service, another large media outlet, is run by the CCP Central Committee's United Front Work Department. Xinhua News Agency is a ministry-level institution directly under the State Council, while People's Daily is the official newspaper of the CCP Central Committee.

The government uses a variety of approaches to retain some control over the media:

- It requires that newspapers be registered and attached to a government ministry, institute, research facility, labor group, or other State-sanctioned entity. Entrepreneurs cannot establish newspapers or magazines under their own names, although they reportedly have had some success in setting up research institutes and then creating publications attached to those bodies.
- It still occasionally jails or fines journalists for unfavorable reporting.
- It imposes other punishments when it deems that criticism has gone too far. For example, it shut down the magazine Future and Development in 1993 for publishing two articles calling for greater democracy in mainland China, and it forced the firing of the Beijing Youth Daily's editor for aggressively covering misdeeds and acts of poor judgment by CCP cadres.
- It continues to make clear that criticism of certain fundamental policies—such as those on PRC sovereignty over territories under Republic of China administration and Tibet and on Hong Kong's future in the wake of the transfer of Hong Kong sovereignty on July 1, 1997 —are off limits.
- It has set up numerous official journalists' associations—the largest is the All-China Journalist Federation, with more than 400,000 members—so that no single entity can develop major autonomous power.
- It holds weekly meetings with top newspaper editors to direct them as to what news items they want focused upon and which stories they want to go unreported. The controversial closure of the Freezing Point journal was generally unreported in mainland China due to government orders.
- It has maintained a system of uncertainty surrounding the boundaries of acceptable reporting, encouraging self-censorship. One media researcher has written that "it is the very arbitrariness of this control regime that cows most journalists into more conservative coverage."

However, criticism of the government is not the biggest alarm for the CCP. They focus on censoring posts and content that have the biggest "collective action potential." It is the fear of organization that grounds the CCP in their censorship practices, not the fear of being critiqued. In fact, as long as there are no posts with collective action potential, the CCP can use social media as a tool to further their control. By getting to see and understand what their citizens are thinking and feeling, they can better govern to maintain order, stability, and control.

== Provincial and local media ==
Local investigative reporting is sometimes viewed favorably by central authorities because of its use in identifying local problems or administrative missteps. Provincial media generally have greater latitude in investigative reporting in areas other than the province where they are based, as local authorities lack direct leverage. Senior executives in local media are appointed by local governments.

In June 2024, the 2007 Emergency Response Law was amended, stating that local governments must "guide news media organisations and support them in reporting and control of discussions" regarding reporting on accidents and disasters.

== International operations ==
As of 2012, CCTV and Xinhua had greatly expanded international coverage and operations, particularly in Africa.

=== Chinese media in Africa ===
As early as 1948, the Xinhua News Agency established its first overseas bureau in sub-Saharan Africa. Initially, the Chinese media presence sought to promote Sino-African relations and "played an important role in assisting the government in developing diplomatic relations with newly independent African countries". Africa-China media relations became more sophisticated when the Forum on China–Africa Cooperation (FOCAC) was founded in 2000. In 2006, during the first FOCAC Summit in Beijing, the Chinese government presented its vision on media cooperation with Africa. Media exchange should "enhance mutual understanding and enable objective and balanced media coverage of each other". Through FOCAC, the Chinese influence on the African mediasphere has increased. In 2006, China Radio International (CRI) was established in Nairobi followed by the launch of the Chinese state-run CGTN Africa and the establishment of an African edition of China Daily in 2012. Additionally, China offers workshops and exchange programs to African journalists to introduce them to Chinese politics, culture, and economy as well as the Chinese media system. China does not only invest in African media outlets and journalists, but also in their digital infrastructure. The Chinese government grants financial and technical aid to African countries to expand their communications structure.

Scholars argue that through increased media presence and investments, the Chinese government tries to dominate the public sphere in Africa and expand its soft power. Research shows that Chinese news media in Africa portray China-Africa relations in an extremely positive light with little space for criticism. Hence, China tries to shape African narratives in its favor. However, Chinese media influence in Africa is still relatively new, and therefore, the consequences of Chinese media engagement in Africa remain unclear. Despite China's efforts to support the African media infrastructure and promote China-Africa relations, African perceptions of China vary significantly and are complex. In general, a case study of South Africa shows that China is perceived as a powerful trading nation and economic investments result in a positive Chinese image. Yet, South African journalists are critical of Chinese media intervention and concerned about practices of Chinese journalism. Likewise, a study about Uganda reveals that journalists are worried about media cooperation with China because it poses a threat to the Freedom of the press. To conclude, the success of Chinese media influence in Africa depends on whether they can prevail in the African market and control the narrative in their favor.

=== Overseas Chinese media ===
In 2001, the Jamestown Foundation reported that China was buying into Chinese-language media in the U.S., offering free content, and leveraging advertising dollars –all to manipulate coverage. The Guardian reported in 2018 that the China Watch newspaper supplement was being carried by The Telegraph along with other newspapers of record such as The New York Times, The Wall Street Journal and Le Figaro.

=== International communication centers ===
International communication centers (ICC, Chinese: 国际传播中心) are state media institutions established by provinces and cities of the People's Republic of China. They operate under the supervision of the Central Propaganda Department of the Chinese Communist Party, with state media outlets such as China Daily, Xinhua News Agency, and China News Service providing infrastructure and serving as a partner to many. The first ICCs were established in 2018 in response to General Secretary of the Chinese Communist Party Xi Jinping's call to "innovate" foreign-directed propaganda. According to Qiushi, the theoretical journal of the Chinese Communist Party (CCP), ICCs are "developed based on local propaganda needs" and aim to be a "new force" in the party's global propaganda ecosystem.

== International rankings ==
As of 2025, China ranks second-to-last in terms of press freedoms in the world, according to Reporters Without Borders' World Press Freedom Index. Reporters Without Borders called China "the world's largest prison for journalists, and its regime conducts a campaign of repression against journalism and the right to information worldwide."

== See also ==
- Blocking of Wikipedia by the People's Republic of China
- Censorship in the People's Republic of China
- China National Radio
- China Radio International
- China News Service
- Chinese Central Television
- International Freedom of Expression eXchange
- Internet freedom
- Internet in the People's Republic of China
  - Digital divide in the People's Republic of China
- Newspapers of China
  - People's Daily
  - China Daily
  - Global Times
- Propaganda in the People's Republic of China
- Sino-Japanese Journalist Exchange Agreement
- Telecommunications in the People's Republic of China
- Television in the People's Republic of China
- TV Series (China)
- Xinhua News Agency
- List of documentary films about China
