= Symposium on News Reporting and Public Opinion =

2016 Chinese Communist Party gathering

- Native name: 党的新闻舆论工作座谈会
- Date: 19 February 2016
- Location: Great Hall of the People, Beijing. China
- Organised by: Chinese Communist Party; • Xi Jinping (General Secretary)

The Symposium on News Reporting and Public Opinion was a meeting on the news and public opinion work of the Chinese Communist Party (CCP) convened by CCP General Secretary Xi Jinping on February 19, 2016.

== The symposium ==
On the morning of February 19, CCP General Secretary Xi Jinping visited the People's Daily Press, Xinhua News Agency and China Central Television (CCTV) for research. On the afternoon of the same day, Xi formally convened and presided over the Symposium on News Reporting and Public Opinion at the Great Hall of the People. Participants included Yang Zhenwu, President of the People's Daily, Cai Mingzhao, President of Xinhua News Agency, Nie Chenxi, President of the CCTV, and editor representative Fan Zhengwei, reporter representative Li Keyong, and host representative. Xi made a speech at the meeting, emphasizing that "political direction must be placed first, firmly adhere to the principle of party spirit, firmly adhere to the Marxist view of journalism, firmly adhere to the correct public opinion orientation, and firmly adhere to positive propaganda as the main focus." At the speech he said that:

Most fundamental to adhering to the principal of party spirit in the Party’s news and public opinion work is adhering to the Party’s leadership of news and public opinion work. The media operated by the Party and the government are propaganda positions of the Party and the government, and must be surnamed Party. All of the work of the Party’s news and public opinion media must evince the Party’s will, reflect the Party’s positions, protect the authority of the Party’s Central Committee, protect the unity of the Party, and achieve love for the Party, protection of the Party and service of the Party.

In his speech, Xi Jinping put forward 48 requirements such as "clarifying fallacies and distinguishing right from wrong" as well as "politicians running newspapers" and telling China's stories well.

== See also ==
- Propaganda in China
- Ideology of the Chinese Communist Party
