= Gao Yu (journalist) =

Chinese journalist and dissident (born 1944)

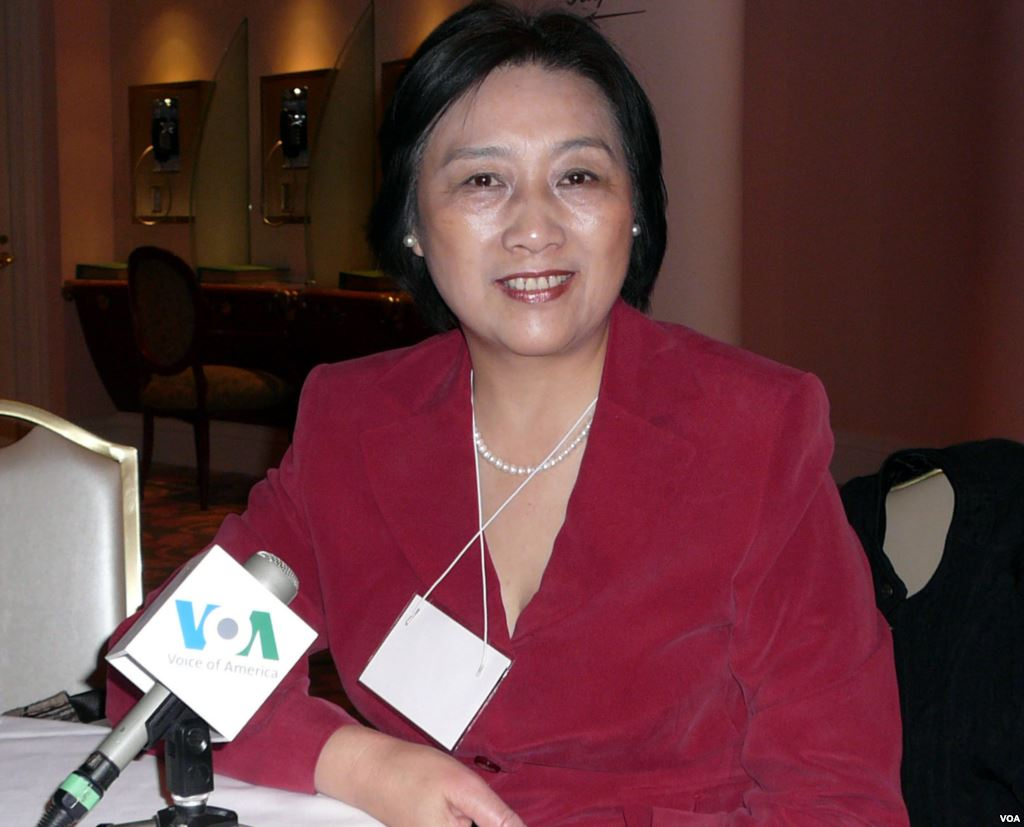
- Gao in August 2007
- Born: 23 February 1944 (age 82); Chongqing, Republic of China
- Education: Renmin University of China
- Occupations: Journalist; columnist

Gao Yu (Chinese: 高瑜; pinyin: Gāo Yú; born 23 February 1944) is a Chinese journalist and dissident who has been repeatedly imprisoned.

== Early life ==
Gao was born in Chongqing. She attended the Language and Literature Department at the Renmin University of China, where she majored in literary theory.

== Career ==
Gao began her journalism career in 1979 as a reporter for the China News Service. In 1988, she became deputy chief editor of Economics Weekly, edited by dissident intellectuals. She also worked as a freelance journalist for different newspapers in China and in Hong Kong. In November 1988, she published an article in Hong Kong's Mirror Monthly, which was described by Beijing's Mayor Chen Xitong as a "political program for turmoil and rebellion". He branded her as a "people's enemy". She was arrested in 1989, after the Tiananmen Square protests, and released 15 months later because of health problems.

Gao was arrested again in October 1993, and in November 1994 was sentenced to six years, accused of having "published state secrets". In February 1999, she was given parole in poor health.

In 2014, Gao was arrested again a few weeks ahead of the 25th anniversary of the Tiananmen Square crackdown. The detention of the outspoken 70-year-old journalist was just one of several detentions of government critics over the previous days ahead of the politically sensitive 4 June anniversary.

In April 2015, Beijing's high court convicted Gao of leaking state secrets and sentenced her to seven years in prison. According to Reporters Without Borders, the authorities accused Gao of sending "Document Number Nine" to a foreign news organization, although the document had already been posted online. Following an appeal, her sentence was reduced to five years on 26 November 2015. Hours later, Chinese state media announced she has been released on medical parole, however the conviction for leaking state secrets was not overturned. As of 2016, she is serving a five-year sentence under house arrest.

German president Joachim Gauck, on his first state visit to China in March 2016, raised the plight of Gao with the Chinese government. Gao once wrote for the German broadcaster Deutsche Welle. Days after Gauck's comments on Gao, Beijing municipal authorities and police raided her home, demolishing her study which they claimed was an illegal structure, and ransacking the rest of her home. Gao put up a fight but collapsed due to apparent high blood pressure. Gao stated that the raid was illegal and the authorities gave no advance notice. Sources claimed that the raid was conducted in retaliation for the German president's comments. Gao's home has been ransacked by the police before, when they came to arrest her in 2014. In April 2015, Gao was sentenced to prison for 7 years. Gao appealed and in November 2015, her sentenced length being reduced to 5 years. Gao was released from prison on April 23, 2019.

== Awards ==
While incarcerated, Gao Yu received the WAN-IFRA (World Association of Newspapers and News Publishers) Golden Pen of Freedom and the IWMF (International Women's Media Foundation) Courage in Journalism Award in 1995. In March 1997, she became the first journalist to receive the UNESCO/Guillermo Cano World Press Freedom Prize. In 2000 she was named one of International Press Institute's 50 World Press Freedom Heroes of the 20th century.
