= Document Number Nine =

CCP confidential internal document outlining dangerous "Western values"

Communiqué on the Current State of the Ideological Sphere
- Simplified Chinese: 关于当前意识形态领域情况的通报
- Traditional Chinese: 關於當前意識形態領域情況的通報
- Literal meaning: Briefing on the Current Situation in the Ideological Realm
Transcriptions
Standard Mandarin
- Hanyu Pinyin: Guānyú dāngqián yìshí xíngtài lǐngyù qíngkuàng de tōngbào

Document Number Nine (or Document No. 9), more properly the Communiqué on the Current State of the Ideological Sphere (also translated as the Briefing on the Current Situation in the Ideological Realm), is a confidential internal document widely circulated within the Chinese Communist Party (CCP) in 2013 by the General Office of the CCP Central Committee.

The document was first circulated in July 2012. The document warns of seven dangerous Western values, including media freedom and judicial independence. Teaching on any of the seven topics is forbidden. There is an emphasis on controlling and preventing communication using the internet of ideas subversive to one party rule. The document was issued in the context of planned economic reforms and increased calls for political reform. It has been described as a critique of the "liberal ways of thinking". "Document 9," as it would come to be called, heralded the tone of the administration of new CCP General Secretary Xi Jinping. It laid bare many major themes of Xi's tenure: a disdain for genuine, grassroots civil society; a reassertion of CCP control over any and all media messaging; and an insistence that the CCP alone can describe and interpret history.

The document was not made available to public by the CCP or any branches of the Chinese government, but in July 2013 was allegedly leaked by Chinese dissident journalist Gao Yu, who in turn was sentenced to a seven-year imprisonment for "leaking state secrets". It is unclear whether this document is official Chinese policy or just a faction within the party. However, The New York Times suggests that it "bears the unmistakable imprimatur of Xi Jinping". It is thought that Document No. 9 was issued by the General Office of the Central Committee, and would have required the approval of Xi Jinping and other top leaders.

== Name ==
The document has been described as a communiqué or circular. The name of the document (Document Number Nine), as it came to be commonly referred in Western English-language press, comes from the fact that it was the ninth such document issued that year in China.

== Contents ==
The document is highly critical of what can be broadly described as "Western values" (the document itself uses terms such as "Western values", "Western principles", "Western standards", "Western ideas", and more precisely, "Western constitutional democracy" (its first item) and "Western-style theories of governance", as well as making references to "Western anti-China forces"). The document is critical of "extremely malicious" ideals spreading in the Chinese society, such as ideas of (Western) constitutional democracy, civil society, universal values (freedom, democracy, and human rights), neo-liberalism, and freedom of the press (described as the "Western news values"). The document warns that such subjects undermine the CCP's control over Chinese society. The document also promotes ways of dealing with these problems, which include "Unwavering adherence to the principle of the Party's control of media."

=== Prelude ===
The prelude to this document references a previous article of 2012 and raises six challenges faced by the CCP in asserting control over its ideology, while also identifying various routes by which Western hostile forces might subvert CCP ideology.

1. The cultural penetration of Western hostile forces threatens the security of our ideology. There are three main ways of cultural penetration:
  - The first is direct cultural propaganda, that is, the use of modern media for long-term ideological penetration.
  - The second is to use cultural commodities as a carrier to infiltrate the various values of the West into the public. (Cultural commodities refers to movies, novels, commercial goods, and other commodities which might be subverted by Western hostile forces.)
  - The third is to infiltrate Western values into social elites such as high-level scholars and intellectuals under the cover of educational and academic exchanges.
2. Various social thoughts aim to hinder or subvert the authoritative identification of China's mainstream ideology.
3. The collapse of the Soviet Union and the fall of communism in Eastern Europe have undermined belief in China's mainstream ideology.
4. The theme of development and the goal of modernization have played down the opposition between ideologies. (i.e. opposition between the Western system of liberal democracy and the Chinese system of "socialism with Chinese characteristics", which by implication are irrevocably opposed.)
5. Diverse value orientations have a negative impact on China's mainstream ideology.
6. Information networking poses a challenge to the control of our ideology.

"They [Critics/Reformers/Dissidents] attack the Party's leaders for placing themselves above the constitution, saying China "has a constitution but no constitutional government." Some people still use the phrase "constitutional dream" to distort the Chinese dream of the great rejuvenation of the Chinese nation, saying things like "constitutional democracy is the only way out" and "China should catch up with the rest of the world's trend toward constitutional governance." The point of publicly proclaiming Western constitutional democracy's key points is to oppose the party's leadership and implementation of its constitution and laws. Their goal is to use Western constitutional democracy to undermine the Party's leadership, abolish the People's Democracy, negate our country's constitution as well as our established system and principles, and bring about a change of allegiance by bringing Western political systems to China."

"Western anti-China forces and internal "dissidents" are still actively trying to infiltrate China's ideological sphere and challenge our mainstream ideology.Some of their latest major efforts include: Some people have disseminated open letters and declarations and have organized petition-signings to vocalize requests for political reforms, improvement of human rights, release of "political prisoners," "reversing the verdict on '6/4'[the Tiananmen Massacre]," and other such political demands; they have made a fuss over asset disclosure by officials, fighting corruption with the Internet, media supervision of government, and other sensitive hot-button issues, all of which stoke dissatisfaction with the Party and government.

... "Some of them are working together with Western anti-China forces, echoing each other and relying on each other's support. This clearly indicates that the contest between infiltration and anti-infiltration efforts in the ideological sphere is as severe as ever, and so long as we persist in Communist Party of China's leadership and socialism with Chinese characteristics, the position of Western anti-China forces to pressure for urgent reform won't change, and they will continue to point the spearhead of Westernizing, splitting, and "Color Revolutions" at China. In the face of these threats, we must not let down our guard or decrease our vigilance."

— Communique on the Current State of our Ideological Sphere, Notice from the General Office of the Central Committee of the Communist Party of China, April 22, 2013

=== The Seven Noteworthy Problems ===
The document specifically addresses the following issues that were seen as problems. These are the terms used in the document itself:

1. Promoting Western Constitutional Democracy: An attempt to undermine the current leadership and the "socialism with Chinese characteristics" system of governance. (Including the separation of powers, multi-party system, general elections, and independent judiciaries.)
2. Promoting "universal values" in an attempt to weaken the theoretical foundations of the Party's leadership. (That "the West's values are the prevailing norm for all human civilization", that "only when China accepts Western values will it have a future".)
3. Promoting civil society in an attempt to dismantle the ruling party's social foundation. (i.e. that individual rights are paramount and ought to be immune to obstruction by the state.)
4. Promoting neoliberalism, attempting to change China's basic economic system. (i.e. "unrestrained economic liberalization, complete privatization, and total marketization".)
5. Promoting the West's idea of journalism, challenging China's principle that the media and publishing system should be subject to Party discipline.
6. Promoting historical nihilism, trying to undermine the history of the CCP and of New China. (For example to deny the scientific and guiding value of Mao Zedong thought.)
7. Questioning Reform and Opening and the socialist nature of socialism with Chinese characteristics. (For example, saying "We have deviated from our Socialist orientation.")

== Leak ==
The contents of the memo became known when accounts of presenting it to a cadre in the Liaoyuan municipal government were published in the local paper. In May 2013, the cadre at the Chongqing Party Committee for Urban and Rural Construction studied the material, as did a cadre in Anyang.

In April 2015, The Wall Street Journal's Josh Chin reported a 71-year-old Chinese journalist was convicted for releasing Document 9. Journalist Gao Yu was sentenced to seven years in prison by Beijing's Third Intermediate People's Court after being found guilty in a closed trial of leaking state secrets to foreign media. Ms Gao was accused by the court of leaking an internal CCP directive to an overseas Chinese news site in 2013, according to her lawyer, Mo Shaoping. Historically, it is rare for Chinese authorities to detain or jail elderly critics, who were traditionally given quiet warnings when they crossed political red lines. The article suggests that the charge is a pretext for aggressive action against political dissent and cites other examples of elderly publishers and journalists being prosecuted.

== Analysis ==
According to an analysis by a reporter at The New York Times, the emphasis on political discipline was also intended to forestall leftist, or Maoist, opposition to needed economic reforms, thus avoiding the split which resulted in the Soviet Union during Gorbachev's reform efforts when media freedom resulted in publishing of a great deal of critical historical material and alienation of the mass of party workers.

== See also ==
- Silent Contest
