= Ren Zhiqiang =

Chinese businessman

- 任志强
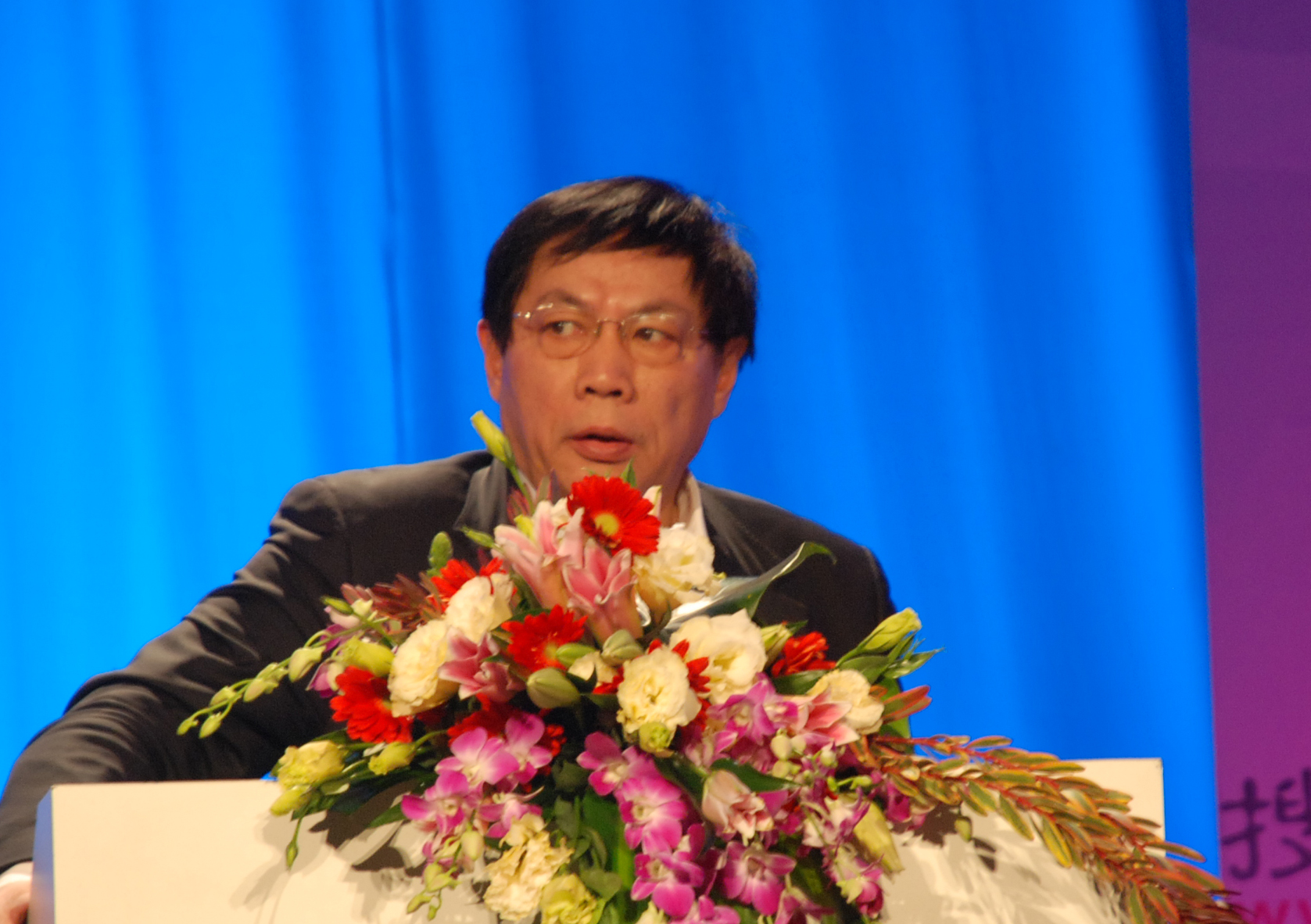
- Ren Zhiqiang in 2012
- Born: 8 May 1951 (age 75); Laizhou, Shandong, China
- Other name: Big Cannon Ren (任大炮)
- Education: Renmin University of China
- Occupations: Businessman, blogger
- Known for: Former chairman of Huayuan Real Estate Group
- Political party: Chinese Communist Party (1974–2020, expelled)
- Criminal charge: Corruption
- Criminal penalty: 18 years imprisonment
- Parent: Ren Quansheng (father)

Chinese name
- Simplified Chinese: 任志强
- Traditional Chinese: 任志強
Transcriptions
Standard Mandarin
- Hanyu Pinyin: Rén Zhìqiáng
- IPA: [ɻə̌n ʈʂɻ̩̂.tɕʰjǎŋ]
Yue: Cantonese
- Yale Romanization: Yahm Ji-kèuhng
- Jyutping: Jam^{6} Zi^{3}-koeng^{4}
- IPA: [jɐm˨ tsi˧.kʰœŋ˩]

Ren Zhiqiang (Chinese: 任志强; born 8 March 1951) is an incarcerated Chinese real estate tycoon. Nicknamed "Big Cannon Ren", he is known for his outspoken views on Sina Weibo, where he accumulated more than 37 million followers until it was deleted by the Chinese authorities in 2016. He disappeared on 12 March 2020 after criticizing CCP general secretary Xi Jinping as a "clown" over the handling of China's response to the COVID-19 pandemic. In September 2020, he was sentenced to eighteen years' imprisonment on corruption charges, after a one-day trial.

== Career ==
Ren Zhiqiang was born in Laizhou, Yantai, Shandong Province on 8 March 1951. His father, Ren Quansheng (任泉生; 1918–2007), served as China's Vice Minister of Commerce, and his mother was a municipal official in Beijing. He studied at Beijing No. 35 Middle School. Ren's parents were persecuted during the Cultural Revolution, and he went to the countryside of Yan'an to work as a sent-down youth in 1968. A year later, he enlisted in the People's Liberation Army, serving as a military engineer in the 38th Army, and later a platoon leader.

Ren left the military in 1981 and became the deputy general manager of Beijing Yida. In 1984, he joined Beijing Huayuan Group Corporation as a department head. He was imprisoned in September 1985, but was released 14 months later without being convicted of any crime. According to his long-time colleague, the reason for his imprisonment was because he had offended the head of the audit department of Beijing's Xicheng District. Ren became vice president of Huayuan Corporation in 1988, and President in 1993. In 2004, he became a Director of the Bank of Beijing Co., Ltd, and in 2007 Chairman of Beijing Huayuan Property Co., Ltd. He holds a Master of Laws degree from Renmin University of China.

In 2010 China Daily reported that Ren, as chairman of Huayuan Real Estate Group, was paid the highest salary of anyone in the 258 listed companies that had filed annual reports. His salary was reportedly 7.07 million yuan ($1.04 million). He resigned as head of the property company in 2014.

Until 2013 he was a member of the Beijing Municipal Committee of the Chinese People's Political Consultative Conference.

== Criticism of the Communist Party ==
Ren is known for his criticism of the Chinese Communist Party. As a property tycoon with forthright views, he has been called "China's Donald Trump". In November 2013, he threatened to sue the state broadcasting company China Central Television (CCTV) after it reported that Huayuan Real Estate owed 54.9 billion yuan in unpaid taxes, and in January 2014, he referred to CCTV as "the dumbest pig on earth". In September 2015, he caused online controversy in China with a Weibo post criticising the Communist Youth League of China, the youth wing of the Communist Party.

In 2016, he openly challenged Communist Party general secretary Xi Jinping's view that government media should toe the Party line. After Xi made an inspection tour of CCTV on 19 February 2016 during which journalists displayed a banner reading "CCTV's surname is the Party. We are absolutely loyal. Please inspect us", Ren posted on Weibo: "When does the people's government turn into the party's government? [Are the media] funded by party membership dues? Don't waste taxpayers' money on things that do not provide them with services." The tweet was subsequently deleted, but on 22 February 2016, state-affiliated media accused Ren of advocating the overthrow of the Communist Party. On 28 February, Ren's Weibo accounts were blocked by the Cyberspace Administration of China (CAC), for "spreading illegal information", cutting Ren off from an estimated 37 million web followers. A day later, the Xicheng District CPC Committee, where Ren's party membership is registered, vowed to punish him under party rules. On 2 May 2016, Ren was placed on a one-year probation within the party.

In a February 2020 essay, Ren criticised a speech given by Xi Jinping concerning the coronavirus pandemic, in which Ren "...saw not an emperor standing there exhibiting his 'new clothes', but a clown stripped naked who insisted on continuing being emperor". He said that the lack of free press and freedom of speech had delayed the official response to the pandemic, worsening its impact.

== Arrest, trial, and imprisonment ==
Ren penned an article critical of Xi Jinping.

On 7 April 2020, the CCP Central Commission for Discipline Inspection announced that Ren was being investigated for alleged "serious violations of law and discipline".

He Weifang said of the investigation: "It is hoped that the judicial authorities can handle this case strictly and in accordance with the law, and give a convincing demonstration of why the remarks constitute violations of the law and even crimes."

On 23 July 2020, he was expelled from the Chinese Communist Party, paving the way for his criminal prosecution. On 22 September 2020, after a one-day trial, a Chinese court found Ren guilty and sentenced him to prison for 18 years for corruption, bribery, and the misuse of public funds, claiming that he did not contest the charges. During the one day trial he represented himself and the trial was held under heavy security as journalists suggested this was due to the stature of Ren as a princeling who dared to oppose Xi.

On 4 October 2024, Ren's daughter, Ren Xinyi, published an open letter to Xi Jinping on WeChat urging him to release her father on compassionate grounds, citing his deteriorating health conditions due to a serious prostate ailment and worsening asthma.
