= Public opinion guidance =

Chinese Communist Party directive

- Simplified Chinese: 舆论导向
Transcriptions
Standard Mandarin
- Hanyu Pinyin: Yúlùn dǎoxiàng

Public opinion guidance is a policy and slogan of the Chinese Communist Party (CCP) regarding its exercise of control over the media in an attempt to align public opinion with CCP ideology.

== Definition ==
According to the China Media Project, public opinion guidance is normally defined to have the following aspects:

1. "Major Party media must not print or broadcast content that in policy or spirit is at odds with the Party."
2. "Media should actively promote the policies of the Party and facilitate public understanding of these policies."
3. "If public opinion differs from the Party on any matters, the media are responsible for sufficiently guiding the public so as to bring their opinions in line with the Party spirit."
4. "If news reports or propaganda appear concealing certain trends at odds with the aims of the Party, the media must act to prevent the possible spread of these trends."
5. "News that is not in the interest of the Party must be rejected, and media must not be so bold as to publicize such news."
6. "The media must ensure correct and unerring guidance of public opinion by thoroughly respecting the Party's discipline of propaganda."
7. "The media must provide journalists with a foundation of expert knowledge and research in propaganda techniques in order to improve the results of propaganda guidance."

According to the All-China Journalists Association, public opinion guidance refers to political parties and groups setting agendas, building frameworks, and providing opinions through mass media to guide the public toward the ideology they advocate and make public opinion flow in the expected direction.

== History ==
The term first appeared after the 1989 Tiananmen Square protests and massacre, when the Publicity Department of the Chinese Communist Party dictated that the news media must "uphold correct guidance of public opinion". In the National Working Conference on Propaganda Thought in 1994, officials said the media must "arm the people with scientific principles, guide the people with correct public opinion, mould the people with a noble spirit, and invigorate the people with excellent works".

At the National Conference on Publicity and Ideology Work on 24 January 1996, CCP General Secretary Jiang Zemin proposed that "the political tumult of 1989, and the severe missteps in the leading of public opinion taught everyone in the Party an important lesson". On 26 September 1996, after inspection trips to the People's Daily, Jiang said "control of news and public opinion had to be placed firmly in the hands of those who had a deep respect for Marxism, for the Party and for the people". He continued by saying "units responsible for news and public opinion must place firm and correct political bearings above all other priorities, thereby upholding correct guidance of public opinion."

Under the leadership of Hu Jintao, the CCP used public opinion channeling (Chinese: 舆论引导). At the National Ideology Work Conference in December 2003, Hu said that the CCP must "not only educate people, guide people, inspire people and spur people on, but must also respect people, understand them, care about them and help them." At the 17th Party National Congress in October 2007, Hu introduced the concept "raising the capacity for public opinion channeling", calling for "respecting differences and tolerating diversity".

In February 2016, CCP General Secretary Xi Jinping gave a speech outlining his media policy, where he said media must "firmly adhere to correct guidance of public opinion" and "must hold the family name of the party". In September 2017, the Cyberspace Administration of China released regulations regarding the management of chat groups on social media services such as WeChat and Tencent QQ, which said "providers of information services through internet chat groups on the internet, and users, must adhere to correct guidance, promoting socialist core values, fostering a positive and healthy online culture, and protecting a favorable online ecology". Large language models, such as those produced by DeepSeek, have increased in usage for "public opinion guidance."

== See also ==
- Censorship in China
- Propaganda in China
- Public opinion struggle
- Politicians run the newspapers
