= Party media takes the party's last name =

Chinese Communist Party slogan

Media sponsored by the Party and government must hold the family name of the party (Chinese: 党和政府主办的媒体必须姓党; pinyin: dǎng hé zhèngfǔ zhǔbàn de méitǐ bìxū xìng dǎng), often abbreviated as Party surnames party media (Chinese: 党媒姓党; pinyin: dǎng méi xìng dǎng), is a phrase from a speech made by General Secretary of the Chinese Communist Party (CCP) Xi Jinping in 2016, used to emphasize the supremacy of the CCP over China's state media and mass media.

== Origins ==
In December 2015, Xi Jinping demanded that military newspapers must be loyal to the party when he inspected the People's Liberation Army Daily.

On February 19, 2016, Xi visited Xinhua News Agency and other media outlets, and during an investigation at China Central Television (CCTV), officials displayed a slogan "CCTV's surname is 'The Party'. [We are] absolutely loyal. Ready for your inspection." Later in the day, Xi said in the Symposium on News Reporting and Public Opinion that:

... The media run by the party and the government are the propaganda fronts and must have the party as their family name. All the work by the party's media must reflect the party's will, safeguard the party's authority, and safeguard the party's unity, They must love the party, protect the party, and closely align themselves with the party leadership in thought, politics and action.

— Xi Jinping, transcribed from The Guardian

== Controversies ==
=== Ren Zhiqiang's criticism ===
Shortly after Xi's visit, Ren Zhiqiang, a property tycoon and party member with more than 30 million followers on Weibo, made a post: "Since when did the people's government become the party's government? Does the money they spend come from party dues? Don't go using taxpayer money to do things that aren't in service of taxpayers," and "when the media are loyal first to the party and don't represent the interests of the people, then the people will be abandoned in a forgotten corner." The posting was removed shortly afterwards, and on February 22, Chinese media outlet Qianlong accused Ren of representing capitalism and attempting to overthrow the CCP. On February 28, the Cyberspace Administration of China ordered Weibo to shut down Ren's account, saying Ren was spreading "illegal messages". However, Ren was not punished further at the time, which was said to be related to the discontent that existed within the party.

=== Southern Metropolis Daily incident ===
On February 20, 2016, Southern Metropolis Daily, a liberal-leaning media outlet, placed Xi's words on its front page together with the news of the sea burial of Yuan Geng, a CCP official, making the front page read, "the media whose surname is party, its soul returns to the sea." Despite the perceived dissatisfaction with the party media's surname discourse, the Southern Metropolis Daily and numerous journalists said it was not intentional and was only a mistake. An announcement circulated a few days later stated that "malicious online interpretations by some people of serious mistakes by editors who have serious deficits in political sensitivity led to a serious guidance incident," and three senior newspaper staffs were disciplined, although all three said they were unaware of the situation. On March 29, Yu Shaolei, a prominent editor of the newspaper, announced his resignation, stating that he could "no longer follow your surname".

== See also ==
- Propaganda in China
- Censorship in China
- Xi Jinping Thought
- Document Number Nine
- Chinese information operations and information warfare
