= Propaganda in China =

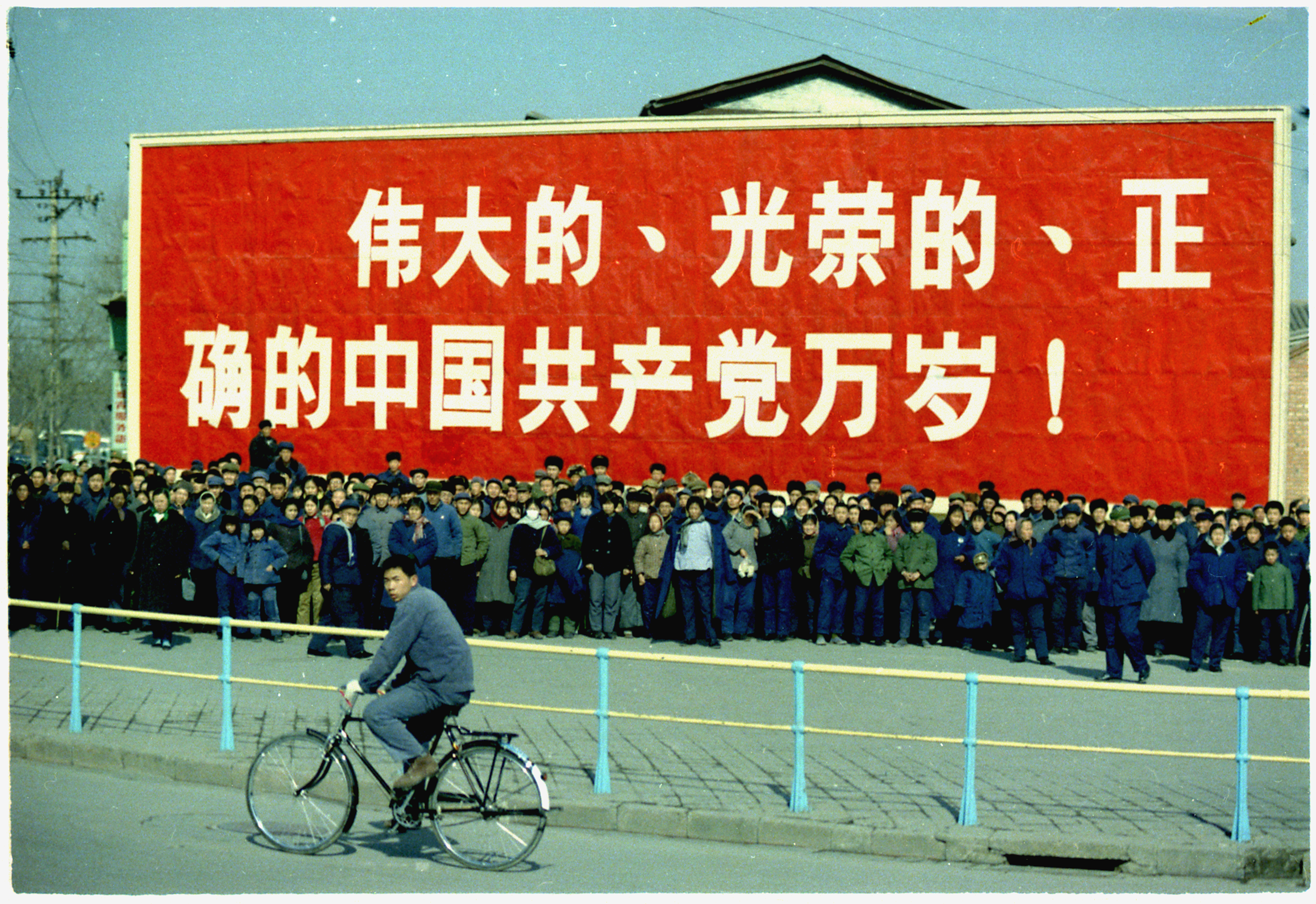
- A propaganda slogan in 1972: "Long Live the Great, Glorious, and Correct Communist Party of China!"
- Simplified Chinese: 中华人民共和国宣传活动
- Traditional Chinese: 中華人民共和國宣傳活動
Transcriptions
Standard Mandarin
- Hanyu Pinyin: Zhōnghuá Rénmín Gònghéguó xuānchuán huódòng

Propaganda is used by the Chinese Communist Party (CCP), and historically by the Kuomintang (KMT), to sway domestic and international opinion in favor of its policies. In the People's Republic of China (PRC), this includes censorship of proscribed views and active promotion of views that favor the government. Propaganda is considered central to the operation of the CCP and the PRC government, with propaganda operations in the country being directed by the CCP's Publicity Department.

Terms to denote propaganda in Chinese have typically had broader and less negative connotations than understandings of the word "propaganda" in the West. Aspects of propaganda can be traced back to the earliest periods of Chinese history, but modern propaganda has been most effective in the 20th and 21st centuries owing to mass media and an authoritarian government. Propaganda was an important tool in legitimizing the Nationalist government, which retreated to Taiwan in 1949. Propaganda during the Mao era was known for its constant use of mass campaigns to legitimize the CCP and the policies of leaders, using modern mass propaganda techniques, adapted to the needs of a country with a largely rural and illiterate population. Contemporary propaganda in the PRC is usually depicted through cultivation of the economy and Chinese nationalism. Under the general secretaryship of Xi Jinping, propaganda in media has become more prevalent and homogeneous.

== Terminology ==
Xuanchuan

Chinese name
- Traditional Chinese: 宣傳
- Simplified Chinese: 宣传
- Literal meaning: spread transmit
Transcriptions
Standard Mandarin
- Hanyu Pinyin: xuānchuán
- Wade–Giles: hsüan-ch'uan
Hakka
- Romanization: siên-chhòn
Yue: Cantonese
- Jyutping: syun1 cyun4
Middle Chinese
- Middle Chinese: sjwendrjwen
Old Chinese
- Baxter–Sagart (2014): *s-qʷarm-tron

Vietnamese name
- Vietnamese: tuyên truyền

Korean name
- Hangul: 선전
Transcriptions
- Revised Romanization: seonjeon
- McCune–Reischauer: sŏnjŏn

Japanese name
- Kanji: 宣伝
- Hiragana: せんでん
Transcriptions
- Revised Hepburn: senden

While the English word usually has a pejorative connotation, the Chinese word xuānchuán (宣传 "propaganda; publicity", composed of xuan 宣 "declare; proclaim; announce" and chuan 傳 or 传 "pass; hand down; impart; teach; spread; infect; be contagious") is generally neutral. The term is not used for censorship, as it might connote in other parts of the world.

Xuānchuán first appeared in the 3rd-century historical text Records of the Three Kingdoms where its usage referred to the dissemination of military skills. In pre-modern times, the term was used to refer to dissemination of ideas and information by ruling elites.

The term xuānchuán was chosen to translate the Marxist-Leninist concept of Russian propagánda пропаганда in the early 20th-century China. Within the broader context of Marxism-Leninism, "propaganda" has neither dismissive nor negative connotations. Academic Anne-Marie Brady writes that the terms propaganda and "thought work" (Chinese: 思想工作; pinyin: sīxiǎng gōngzuò) traditionally had a much broader notion of the public sphere than is usually defined in the West. Some xuanchuan collocations usually refer to "propaganda" (e.g., xuānchuánzhàn 宣传战 "propaganda war"), others to "publicity" (xuānchuán méijiè 宣传媒介 "mass media; means of publicity"), and still others are ambiguous (xuānchuányuán 宣传员 "propagandist; publicist"). The term xuanchuan also conveys the meaning of education, whereas the English word propaganda does not. Academic Chang-tai Hung writes that the term "lacks the negative implication of manipulation."

During the 20th century, use of the term propaganda in China approximated its meaning in early modern Europe, "to propagate what one believes to be true." Operating according to this terminology, the CCP is open about the importance of its propaganda work, which it views as having a positive impact on informing the Chinese people and promoting social harmony. Academic David Shambaugh, describes "proactive propaganda" in which the Chinese Communist Party Propaganda Department writes and disseminates information that it believes "should be used in educating and shaping society". In this particular context, xuanchuan "does not carry negative connotations for the CCP, nor, for that matter, for most Chinese citizens." The academic Andrew B. Kipnis says unlike English propaganda, Chinese xuanchuan is officially represented as language that is good for the nation as a whole. However, the CCP is also sensitive to the negative connotations of the English word propaganda, and the commonly used Chinese term xuanchuan acquired pejorative connotations. In 1992, CCP general secretary Jiang Zemin asked one of the CCP's most senior translators to come up with a better English alternative to propaganda as the translation of xuanchuan for propaganda targeting foreign audiences. Replacement English translations include publicity, information, and political communication domestically, or media diplomacy and cultural exchange internationally.

== History ==
=== Republican era ===
Propaganda in the Republic of China (in mainland China before 1949 and in Taiwan since then) has been an important tool since its inception with the 1911 Revolution for legitimizing the Nationalist government that retreated from mainland China to Taiwan in 1949. Anti-communism and resistance against Japanese imperialism have historically been central to propaganda in the Republic of China.

By the 1930s and 1940s, both the KMT and the CCP used documentary films as a form of propaganda.

=== Mao era ===
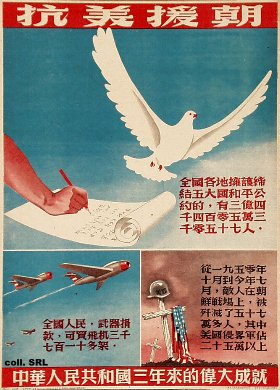
Chinese enlistment poster to volunteer in the Korean War with the grave of an American soldier

The origins of the CCP propaganda system can be traced to Yan'an Rectification Movement and the rectification movements carried out there. Following which it became a key mechanism in the Party's campaigns. Mao Zedong explicitly laid out the political role of culture in his 1942 "Talks at the Yan'an Forum on Art and Literature". The propaganda system, considered a central part of CCP's "control system", drew much from Soviet, Nazi, imperial China, Nationalist China, and other totalitarian states' propaganda methods. It represented a quintessential Leninist "transmission belt" for indoctrination and mass mobilization. David Shambaugh observes that propaganda and indoctrination are considered to have been a hallmark of the Maoist China; the CCP employed a variety of "thought control" techniques, including incarceration for "thought reform," construction of role models to be emulated, mass mobilization campaigns, the creation of ideological monitors and propaganda teams for indoctrination purposes, enactment of articles to be memorized, control of the educational system and media, a nationwide system of loudspeakers, among other methods. While ostensibly aspiring to a "Communist utopia," often had a negative focus on constantly searching for enemies among the people. The means of persuasion was often extremely violent, "a literal acting out of class struggle."

Starting in the early 1940s, the CCP emphasized the use of "local flavor" in propaganda, including Mao's advocacy that the party should use "national forms," including "old forms," to promote its ideology. The CCP used local customs like yangge and nianhua to mobilize people, promote its ideology, and to implement its cultural policy.

Beginning in March 1947, a series of campaigns commemorated and promoted the legacy of Liu Hulan, widely remembered as the youngest martyr of the Chinese Communist Revolution, through propaganda posters and art.

Chinese propagandists used every possible means of communication available in China after Mao's 1949 proclamation of the People's Republic of China, including electronic media such as film and television, educational curriculum and research, print media such as newspapers and posters, cultural arts such as plays and music, oral media such as memorizing Mao quotes, as well as thought reform and political study classes. During the Mao era, a distinctive feature of propaganda and thought work was "rule by editorial," according to academic Anne-Marie Brady. Political campaigns would be launched through editorials and leading articles in People's Daily, which would be followed by other papers. Work units and other organizational political study groups utilized these articles as a source for political study, and reading newspapers in China was "a political obligation". Mao used Lenin's model for the media, which had it function as a tool of mass propaganda, agitation, and organization.

In arts like painting, the early PRC had promoted Soviet art styles over traditional Chinese forms. By the mid-1950s, relations between China and the Soviet Union were deteriorating, and Mao became increasingly interested in promoting China's own national path. As part of this effort, propaganda campaigns encouraged re-adoption of traditional Chinese art styles.

To promote the Marriage Law of 1950 and its prohibitions on "mercenary marriage," propaganda denounced the sale of and purchase of brides. Propaganda also promoted free-choice marriage, emphasizing that love was an important component of successful marriage.

One trend in 1950s propaganda was the promotion of economic development, depicting people enjoying material benefits of socialist society like furniture, clothing, watches, bicycles, and other goods.

In rural China, traveling drama troupes did propaganda work and were particularly important during land reform and other mass campaigns. In 1951, a directive to develop a nationwide propaganda network designated individuals in each school, factory, and work unit as propaganda workers. CCP propaganda sought to promote model workers and soldiers whose productive examples were promoted to the public via radio, and other media. In 1955, the Ministry of Culture sought to develop rural cultural networks to distribute media like other performances, lantern slides, books, cinema, radio, books, and to establish newspaper reading groups. Salaried workers at rural cultural centers toured the countryside distributing propaganda materials, teaching revolutionary songs, and the like.

In the early 1950s, China increased its anti-imperialism propaganda campaigns. This propaganda often emphasized Japanese war crimes.

In the 1960s, Chinese propaganda sought to portray contrasting images of the United States government and the United States public. Propaganda sought to criticize the government for its war in Vietnam while praising the public for anti-war protests. As part of propaganda efforts during the 1965 Resist America, Aid Vietnam Campaign, the CCP organized street demonstrations and marches and promoted campaign messages using cultural media like film and photography exhibitions, chorus contests, and street performance.

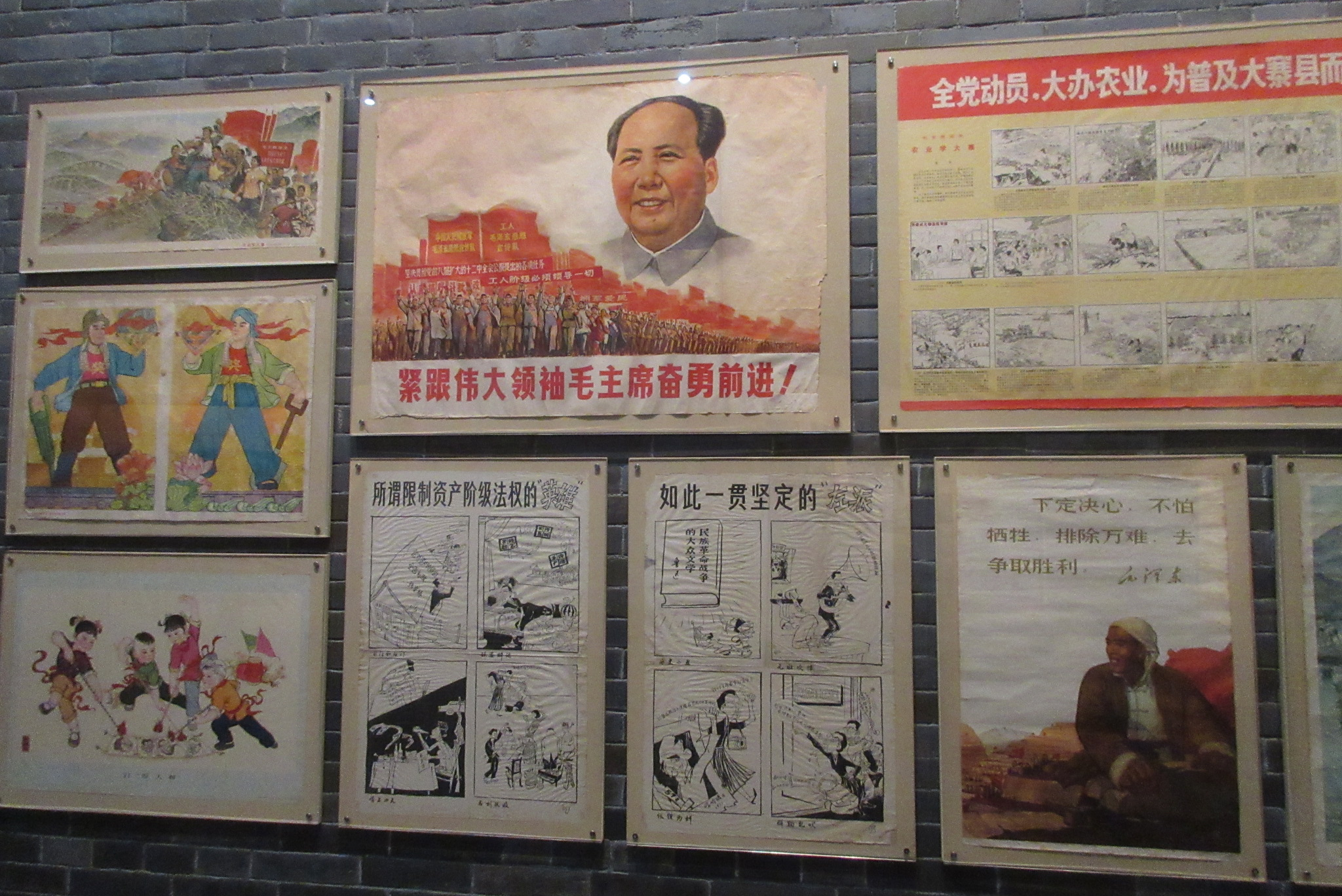
A series of posters from the Cultural Revolution, one of which depicts CCP Chairman Mao Zedong over a mass rally

=== Cultural Revolution ===
==== Background and ideological foundations ====
During the Cultural Revolution, CCP propaganda was crucial to intensification of Mao Zedong's cult of personality, as well as mobilizing popular participation in national campaigns. Past propaganda also encouraged the Chinese people to emulate government approved model workers and soldiers, such as Lei Feng, Chinese Civil War hero Dong Cunrui, Korean War hero Yang Gensi, and Dr. Norman Bethune, a Canadian doctor who assisted the CCP Eighth Route Army during the Second Sino-Japanese War. It also praised Third World revolutionaries and close foreign allies such as Albania and North Korea while vilifying both the American "imperialists" and the Soviet "revisionists" (the latter of whom was seen as having betrayed Marxism–Leninism following the Sino-Soviet split).

The propaganda of the Cultural Revolution incorporated strong anti-imperialist rhetoric, particularly in the context of the Vietnam War. However, as domestic political struggles intensified in the early Cultural Revolution, international messaging became less emphasized.

In the 1960s and 1970s, propaganda on science presented scientific inquiry as a "great revolutionary movement" which would remove distinctions between experts and the masses and the division between mental and manual labor.

==== Art ====
The early period, from the outbreak of the Cultural Revolution to the death of Lin Biao in 1971, focused on the destruction of “old culture” and the consolidation of the Mao cult. Artistic production during this phase emulated the revolutionary aesthetic associated with the Yan’an period, emphasizing bold militant imagery and ideological clarity.

In January 1967, established artists were publicly denounced, and younger artists including members of the Red Guards established control over the manufacturing of art. Immediately afterwards billboards facing the Tiananmen Square were commandeered by two competing Red Guard groups from various art schools. The artwork painted on those billboards would go on to inspire the designs of subsequent billboards. The Red Art Rebels, an art student group affiliated with the Red Guards, were granted 300 yuan in 1967 for funding which they used to publish propaganda posters, and fund their political activities, signifying official government support for their activities.

During this period, grassroots forms of propaganda were popularized and placed in a position of prominence. Red Guard publications such as Art Storm criticized both traditional art institutions and political figures associated with rival factions. Rebel artists created widely distributed images based on Mao's quotations, as well as visual attacks on political opponents. However, by 1968 independent Red Guard artistic movements were suppressed, and propaganda production became increasingly institutionalized, though their style of artwork would continue to be used.

Coupled with traditional art, film was also utilized in this period. Newsreel documentaries were particularly popular during this period being screened countrywide. These films would be used to contribute to the cult of personality around Mao, also serving to communicate and implement policy, and provide opportunity for political discussion. These films were screened for free, and because attendance was expected for citizens outside the Five Black Categories, attendance would reach an all-time high. Red Guard rally films were also a unique subset of films that were screened alongside newsreels from 1966 to 1967. These films were produced with the intention of showcasing Mao's support for the rebel movement, and celebrating mass participation, whilst also utilizing a unique cinematic style that went against the established norms of cinematography.

Starting in 1970 and continuing after 1971, control over cultural production became increasingly centralized. Jiang Qing, who had previously shown a preference for Socialist Realism, would emerge as a leading figure in cultural policy, being appointed director of the Culture Group under the State Council in 1970. Under her tenure, the government emphasized art that combined academic techniques with folk elements while using the rhetoric of serving the people and continuing the Mao Cult. The focus of propaganda shifted somewhat from purely revolutionary imagery to more everyday subject matter, though still framed within Maoist ideology. State-sponsored exhibitions became an important means of publishing and disseminating propaganda, with selected works from these exhibitions being reproduced in posters and publications for nationwide circulation.

Jiang Qing also exercised a strong control over the Chinese film industry in this period, banning and taking issue with many films over the framing between protagonists and antagonists, feeling that audiences were identifying too closely with the latter. She would supervise the creation of the few feature films created in this period, with these new films lacking depictions of romance or comedy, being reminiscent of contemporary revolutionary operas. Jiang Qing also established a new system of commune operated projectionists, replacing the old system of travelling projections, making films a monthly or bimonthly event in villages throughout China.

==== Big-character posters ====
Big-character posters became especially influential in the early phases of the Cultural Revolution. Although used prior to 1966, they gained prominence after Mao endorsed their use following a May 25, 1966 poster by Nie Yuanzi and her colleagues at Peking University, in which they criticized three university administrators for their lack of commitment to the Cultural Revolution. From then on, these posters were used to criticize officials and spread ideological messages.

==== Performance and mass participation ====
Propaganda was also disseminated through performance. Mao Zedong Thought Propaganda Teams operated nationwide between 1966 and 1968, staging plays and musical performances to disseminate ideological messages. Children and students also often participated in these teams, serving as what the government saw as models of ideal socialist behavior. Local governments and production brigades occasionally provided financial and material support, all contributing to their reputation as successful propagandists.

Slogans also played a significant role in shaping public attitudes in this period. One widely circulated phrase, created by middle schoolers was, “If the father’s a hero, the son’s a brave; if the father’s a counter-revolutionary, the son’s a bastard” which reinforced notions of hereditary class identity.

==== Print and literature ====
Printed materials were also central to the dissemination of propaganda. Notably during the Criticize Lin, Criticize Confucius campaign starting in 1973, the government printed the four reference materials for use as reference in the aid of the propaganda movement. To support the movement, classical Confucian texts were republished and additionally ardent readings were encouraged to provide context for criticism. The state played an active role in promoting these works, using media advertising to generate demand and implementing price controls to ensure affordability for cases such as minority-language editions which were otherwise more expensive to print. In teaching these classics, the government was also able to draw allegories from previous history, for instance with Mao being identified with the first emperor of China, and Lin Biao being identified with the emperor's failed assassin during the Criticize Lin, Criticize Confucius campaign. Mao himself advocated for this approach in interpreting history through the principle of making the past serve the present.

In the seventies following the suppression of the Red Guards and in conjunction with the Criticize Lin, Criticize Confucius campaign, the Chinese government worked to expand access through libraries and coordinated national campaigns in order to more effectively disseminate written propaganda. Advertising and news coverage built anticipation for new publications, encouraging widespread readership, and on occasion this caused issues with excessive demand for propaganda resulting in shortages.

==== Effectiveness and reception ====
Scholars have had differing views on the effectiveness of the Cultural Revolution's propaganda. Repetition ensured consistent exposure to key messages, while the use of diverse media including visual art, opera, and music allowed propaganda to reach a broad audience. The movement also built upon earlier propaganda traditions which set the foundation for which the propaganda was based. At the same time, the cultural experience offered by propaganda, particularly access to art forms previously associated with elite audiences, made it appealing even to those who did not fully agree with its content. However, not all art was received well, with audiences being discontent with films in the latter half of the Cultural Revolution. This was due to an increased frequency of film screenings coupled with a previously established issue of predictability and the new issue of less variety in films owing to Jiang Qing's actions in curating, which resulted in boredom for some viewers. Due to feeling used by the government, there was also a private backlash against the cult of personality around Mao among some of the youth who participated in the Down to the Countryside Movement.

=== Modern era ===
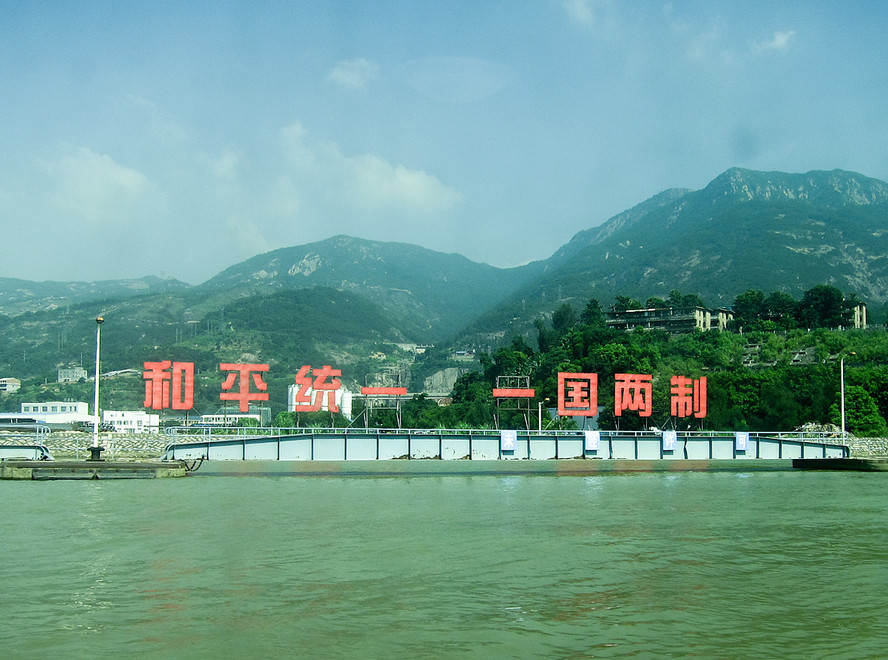
Propaganda sign in Xiamen, China facing Kinmen, Republic of China. Sign says "Peaceful Unification. One country two systems".

Following the death of Chairman Mao in 1976, propaganda was used to blacken the character of the Gang of Four, which was blamed for the excesses of the Cultural Revolution. During the era of reform and opening up and "Four Modernizations" initiated by Deng Xiaoping, propaganda promoting socialism with Chinese characteristics was distributed. The first post-Mao campaign was in 1983 which saw the Anti-Spiritual Pollution Campaign.

In 1977, Deng initiated a propaganda campaign to promote science as the cornerstone of China's modernization, in advance of the 1978 National Science Conference. The campaign helped advanced Deng's efforts to improve the quality of science in China, particularly basic research, following the Cultural Revolution. Chinese Academy of Sciences vice president Fang Yi led the campaign in having schools, factories, and communes organize youth-focused events to celebrate science and technology.

The 1989 Tiananmen Square protests and massacre were an indication to many elders in the CCP that liberalization in the propaganda sector had gone too far, and that the Party must re-establish its control over ideology and the propaganda system.

Academic Anne-Marie Brady writes that propaganda and thought work have become the "life blood" of the party-state since the post-1989 period, and one of the key means for guaranteeing the CCP's continued legitimacy and hold on power.

In the 1990s, propaganda theorists described the challenges to China's propaganda and thought work as "blind spots"; mass communication was advocated as the antidote. From the early 1990s, selective concepts from mass communications theory, public relations, advertising, social psychology, patriotic education and other areas of modern mass persuasion were introduced into China's propaganda system for the purpose of creating a modern propaganda model.

Particularly since the 1990s, China has engaged in propaganda seeking to eliminate the traditional son preference.

=== 21st century ===
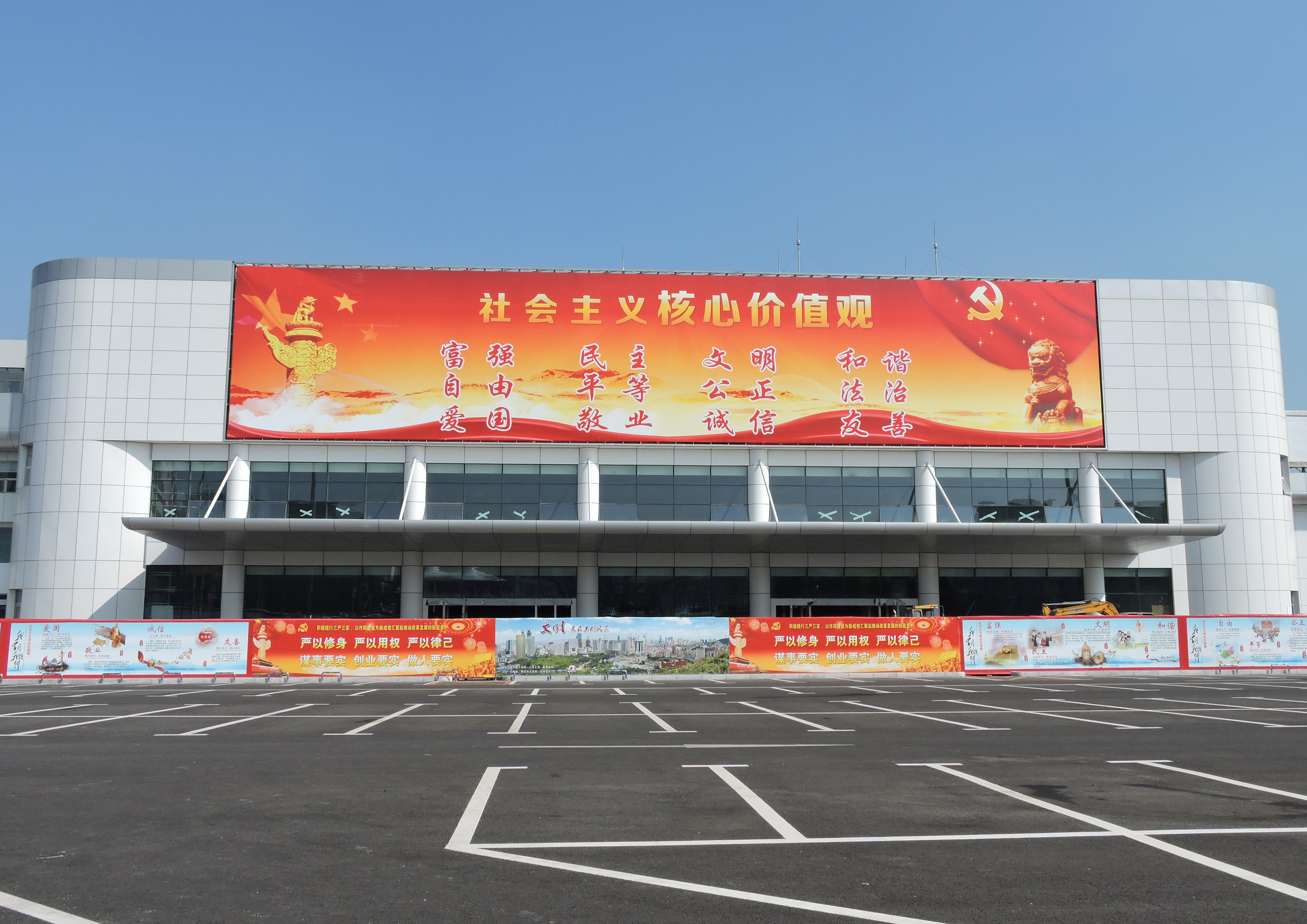
Giant poster listing the twelve Core Socialist Values of the Chinese Communist Party (2017).

The 2008 Summer Olympics were portrayed by the Chinese government as a symbol of China's pride and place in the world, and seem to have bolstered some domestic support for the Chinese government, and support for the policies of the CCP, giving rise to concerns that the state will possibly have more leverage to disperse dissent. In the lead-up to the Olympics, the government allegedly issued guidelines to the local media for their reporting during the Games: most political issues not directly related to the games were to be downplayed; topics such as pro-Tibetan independence and East Turkestan movements were not to be reported on, as were food safety issues such as "cancer-causing mineral water." As the 2008 Chinese milk scandal broke in September 2008, there was widespread speculation that China's desire for a perfect Games may have been a factor contributing towards the delayed recall of contaminated infant formula.

In early 2009, the CCP embarked on a multibillion-dollar global media expansion, including the 24-hour English-language news channel China Global Television Network (CGTN) in the style of Western news agencies. According to Nicholas Bequelin, a senior researcher at Human Rights Watch, it was part of CCP general secretary Hu Jintao's plan to "go global" and make "the voice of China better heard in international affairs", by strengthening their foreign-language services, and being less political in their broadcasting. Bequelin notes that their function is to channel a specific view of China to an international audience, and their fundamental premise remains the same; that all information broadcast must reflect the government's views. The Chinese government encouraged the adaption of Western style media marketing in their news agencies due to internal competition with national commercial media.

In 2011, then Chongqing party secretary Bo Xilai and the city's Propaganda Department initiated a 'Red Songs campaign' that demanded every district, government departments and commercial corporations, universities and schools, state radio and TV stations to begin singing "red songs", praising the achievements of the CCP and PRC. Bo said the aim was "to reinvigorate the city with the Marxist ideals of his father's comrade-in-arms Mao Zedong"; although academic Ding Xueliang of Hong Kong University of Science and Technology suspected the campaign's aim was to further his political standing within the country's leadership.

Since Xi Jinping became the general secretary of the Chinese Communist Party in 2012, censorship and propaganda have been significantly stepped up. Propaganda has become more prevalent and homogeneous. During a visit to Chinese state media, Xi stated that "party-owned media must hold the family name of the party" and that the state media "must embody the party's will, safeguard the party's authority". In 2018, as part of an overhaul of CCP and government bodies, the State Administration of Press, Publication, Radio, Film and Television (SAPPRFT) was renamed into the National Radio and Television Administration (NRTA) with its film, news media and publications being transferred to the Central Propaganda Department. Additionally, the control of China Central Television (CCTV, including its international edition, China Global Television), China National Radio (CNR) and China Radio International (CRI) were transferred to the newly established China Media Group (CMG) under the control of the Central Propaganda Department.

Starting in June 2021 and continuing through at least 2024, China's judicial system has engaged in a propaganda campaign to promote court cases decided in favor of platform economy workers against the companies for which they did work. The judicial system's newspapers and magazines have promoted coverage of typical cases and relevant studies. Academic Angela Huyue Zhang writes that because court rulings in China do not create precedent, the campaign is a mechanism for guiding courts to tighten regulation in this area, particularly where platform workers lack contracts or have been characterized as independent contractors but are in fact subject to tight monitoring by the platform companies that dispatch them.

==== Xinjiang ====
During the July 2009 Ürümqi riots, CCP officials moved swiftly in a public relations campaign. According to Newsweek, CCP officials felt that the recent riots risked tarnishing China's global image, and underwent a public relations program involving quickly getting out the government's official version of the events, as well as transporting foreign journalists to riot affected areas. The growth in new technologies, such as email and SMS, forced the CCP's hand into taking up spin.

Since 2017, the Chinese government has engaged in a propaganda campaign to defend its actions in Xinjiang. China initially denied the existence of the Xinjiang re-education camps and attempted to cover-up their existence. In 2018, after being forced to admit by widespread reporting that the Xinjiang re-education camps exist, the Chinese government initiated a propaganda campaign to portray the camps as humane and to deny human rights abuses occur in Xinjiang. In 2020 and 2021 they expanded the propaganda campaign due to international backlash against government policies in Xinjiang and worries that the Chinese government no longer had control of the narrative.

The Chinese government has used social media as a part of its extensive propaganda campaign. Douyin, the mainland Chinese sister app to ByteDance-owned social media app TikTok, presents users with significant amounts of Chinese state propaganda pertaining to the human rights abuses in Xinjiang.

Chinese government propaganda attacks have targeted international journalists covering human rights abuses in Xinjiang. After providing coverage critical of Chinese government abuses in Xinjiang, BBC News reporter John Sudworth was subjected to a campaign of propaganda and harassment by Chinese state-affiliated and CCP-affiliated media. The public attacks resulted in Sudworth and his wife Yvonne Murray, who reports for Raidió Teilifís Éireann, fleeing China for Taiwan for fear of their safety.

Between July 2019 and early August 2019, the CCP-owned tabloid Global Times paid Twitter to promote tweets that deny that the Chinese government is committing human rights abuses in Xinjiang; Twitter later banned advertising from state-controlled media outlets on 19 August after removing large numbers of pro-Beijing bots from the social network. China has spent heavily to purchase Facebook advertisements in order to spread propaganda designed to incite doubt on the existence and scope of human rights violations occurring within Xinjiang.

In April 2021, the Chinese government released propaganda videos titled, "Xinjiang is a Wonderful Land", and produced a musical titled "The Wings of Songs" in order to portray Xinjiang as harmonious and peaceful. The Wings of Songs portrays an idyllic rural landscape with a cohesive ethnic population notably devoid of repression, surveillance, and Islam. It is near impossible to get accurate information about the situation in Xinjiang domestically in China, concerns within the domestic audience are also downplayed because many aspects of the abuse such as forced labor are seen as commonplace by many Chinese citizens. In 2021, Chinese officials ordered videos of Uyghur men and women saying that they deny the U.S. charges that China that is committing human rights violations.

Critics have said that government propaganda plays into existing colonial and racist tropes about the Uyghurs by depicting them as dangerous or backwards. Domestic propaganda has increased since the international community began considering designating the abuses against the Uyghurs as a genocide. Domestic pushback against the genocide label is also emotional and follows a similar pattern of denial to the genocide committed against the Native Americans.

In February 2025, the Chinese Red Culture Research Association (CRCRA), a state-supervised body of the Chinese Academy of Social Sciences, published an article glorifying past mass killings of Uyghurs by general Wang Zhen during the incorporation of Xinjiang into the People's Republic of China. The article praised violent repression, mass executions, forced cultural assimilation, and religious persecution as effective governance tools, calling for their continued use. Leaders of the East Turkistan Government in Exile and the East Turkistan National Awakening Movement warned that such rhetoric marks an escalation in China's campaign of repression.

==== COVID-19 pandemic ====
In 2020, CCP general secretary Xi Jinping and the rest of the CCP began propagating the idea of "winning a battle against America" in containing the coronavirus pandemic. The numbers are notably misrepresented by Chinese authorities, but the CCP has continued to take to the media, pointing out "the failures of America", even though the numbers are manipulated. The now former Secretary of State Mike Pompeo accused the CCP of spreading disinformation on 17 March. Chinese officials in Japan have referred to the disease as the "Japanese coronavirus", even though there is no such evidence it originated there. The CCP has also used transmitting "positive energy" to promote itself. After Mike Pompeo's accusation that the virus originated in a lab in Wuhan, which Anthony Fauci denied on 5 May, Chinese officials launched a smear campaign on the same day against him with multiple propaganda outlets calling him a liar. During the George Floyd protests, the CCP criticized the US for failing to address racial equality. On 30 May 2020, Morgan Ortagus urged on Twitter for "freedom loving people" to hold the CCP to impose plans on Hong Kong for national security legislation. Her counterpart, Hua Chunying, responded back with "I can't breathe", obviously a reference to Floyd's last words. Some people responded with "I can't tweet" and some have accused the government of using the same police brutality tactics that killed Floyd, with Chinese censors simply deleting the complaints. In Wuhan, where the outbreak first emerged, television shows and documentaries portrayed the response positively, as a heroic success taken care of by "warriors in white coats". Alexander Kekulé's theory of coronavirus-disease 2019 coming from Italy instead of Wuhan which was taken out of context has sparked Chinese propaganda newspapers following the narrative, with even one headline saying, "China is Innocent!" Kekulé himself says it is pure propaganda. State-owned outlets such as Xinhua and the People's Daily have blamed elderly deaths in Norway and Germany on COVID-19 vaccines, even though there is no scientific evidence, and have accused English media of downplaying it.

In 2020, propaganda from China has been controlled by state media and CCP-run outlets such as the nationalistic tabloid Global Times, which portray the handling of COVID-19 as a success. On 11 June 2020, Twitter announced that they deleted over 170,000 accounts tied to a Chinese-state linked operation because they were spreading false information about the COVID-19 pandemic. On 22 June 2020, the United States Department of State designated several Chinese state media outlets as foreign missions. In December 2020, an investigation by The New York Times and ProPublica revealed leaked internal documents showing the state's instructions to local media regarding the death of Li Wenliang. The documents address news organizations and social media platforms, ordering them to stop using push notifications, make no comment on the situation and control any discussion of the event happening in online spaces. The documents also address "local propaganda workers", demanding they steer online discussions away from anything that "seriously damages party and government credibility and attacks the political system". Pro-Chinese government spam networks also attempted to discredit U.S. vaccines.

On the 29th of April 2020, an animated video was posted on Twitter and YouTube, called Once Upon a Virus, used Lego figures to represent China through hospital workers and Lady Liberty representing America, was posted by Xinhua News Agency. The Lego Group, for their part, said they had nothing to do with the video in question. In the video, the hospital worker repeatedly warns the US about the outbreak, but they dismiss them, talking about lockdowns being a violation of human rights, or paywalls. By that point, Lady Liberty is hooked up to an IV and looks severely ill, and at the end, the US says "We are always correct, even when we contradict ourselves", and China responds with "That's what I love best about you Americans, your consistency". The Chinese government delayed warning the public about the outbreak, even as doctors tried to warn people via social media. The Associated Press reports "China's rigid controls on information, bureaucratic hurdles and a reluctance to send bad news up the chain of command muffled early warnings".

==== 100th Anniversary of CCP ====
In 2021, the state orchestrated a propaganda and information control campaign to bolster the 100th Anniversary of the Chinese Communist Party. Chinese state owned media claimed without citing sources that the CIA was recruiting spies speaking various Chinese dialetcs including Cantonese, Shanghainese, Hakka and Hokkien, an assertion which went viral in the Chinese internet. In 2021, the Ministry of Education of China announced that CCP general secretary Xi Jinping's socio-political policies and ideas would be included in the curriculum from primary school up to university level. The 4-volume Xi Jinping Thought on Socialism with Chinese Characteristics for the New Era textbooks for primary, secondary and tertiary school students were subsequently introduced in the new school year in 2021, educators were instructed to "plant the seeds of loving the party, the country and socialism in young hearts". This has led to comparisons of the cults of personality cultivated by Xi Jinping and Mao Zedong.

==== Russian invasion of Ukraine ====
During the 2022 Russian invasion of Ukraine, Chinese diplomats, government agencies, and state-controlled media in China have adopted a sympathetic view of Russia, while emphasizing that the war was caused by the United States and NATO.

On the eve of the attack, Shimian, a digital outlet owned by newspaper Beijing News, accidentally posted an internal memo of the Chinese Cybersecurity Agency to media outlets. The outlets were told to "publish neither information favorable to the United States nor critiques of Russia", the media were also tasked to censor user comments and trend hashtags released by the three state-owned media, Xinhua News Agency, China Central Television (CCTV) and the People's Daily.

Xinhua, CCTV and Global Times often posted unverified news from Russian state-controlled network RT, that were later proven to be erroneous; examples of which were when Global Times posted a video saying that a large number of Ukrainian soldiers had surrendered, or when CCTV reported that Ukrainian President Volodymyr Zelenskyy had fled Kyiv during the initial stages of the war. In the midst of the invasion, China Global Television Network (CGTN) interviewed Denis Pushilin, a Ukrainian separatist leader, who claimed that the "vast majority of citizens want to be as close to Russia as possible". CCTV also censored the live speech of Andrew Parsons, president of the International Paralympic Committee, during the opening ceremony of the 2022 Winter Paralympics held in Beijing, as he condemned the war and called for diplomacy.

Besides official state media channels, private Chinese tech giants such as Tencent, Sina Weibo and ByteDance also amplified conspiracy theories created by Russian state media, such as the false claims of nefarious US biological weapons laboratories in Ukraine and propagating the notion that Ukrainian government consists of neo-Nazis and that the Ukrainian army were sabotaging their own nuclear plant. Chinese streaming platform iQiyi also cancelled the broadcast of the English Premiere League to avoid showing the football teams' support for Ukraine.

There were also numerous reports of censorship of anti-war comments by Chinese academics, celebrities and micro-influencers on social media.

== Mechanics ==
Propaganda and censorship in China are centrally directed by CCP's Central Propaganda Department (CPD). David Shambaugh, American professor and sinologist, wrote in 2007 that the CCP's propaganda system extends itself as a sprawling bureaucratic establishment, into virtually every medium concerned with the dissemination of information. Shambaugh noted that according to the CCP publication Zhongguo Gongchandang jianshe dazidian. numerous public places, such as media and news organizations, educational institutions, literature and art centers, and cultural exhibitions come under CCP's propaganda oversight. Shambaugh believed that this expansive definition implies that every conceivable medium which transmits and conveys information to the people of China falls under bureaucratic purview of the CPD. Shambaugh stated that the writ of the CPD has remained unchanged since the Maoist era, although the mechanics of oversight and active censorship have undergone considerable evolution.

According to official government reports in 2003, channels of propaganda dissemination of the CPD included 2,262 television stations (of which 2,248 were "local"), 2,119 newspapers, 9,074 periodicals and 1,123 publishing houses, in addition to internal circulation papers and local gazetteers, approximately 68 million internet accounts with more than 100 million users, and more than 300 million mobile phone users who fall under the system's purview.

According to Brady, propaganda work by the CCP has been historically divided into two categories: directed towards Chinese people (internal or duinei) and directed towards foreigners and the outside world (external or duiwai) as well as four types: political, economic, cultural and social. The Central Propaganda Department oversees internal propaganda, and, the closely linked bureaucracy, The Office of Foreign Propaganda matters relating to external propaganda.

Shambaugh stated that the propaganda system, including the Central Propaganda Department, are highly secret and does not appear in officially published diagrams of the Chinese Bureaucratic System, whether in Chinese or in other languages. The Office of External Propaganda (OEP) itself is more commonly known as 'State Council Information Office' (SCIO), under the one institution with two names system, according to Brady.

The Central Propaganda Department has direct control over the National Radio and Television Administration. It additionally manages the China Media Group, which controls several of China's largest news agencies. In 2014, the OEP was absorbed into the larger Central Propaganda Department, turning the SCIO into an external nameplate of the department.

=== Control of media ===
Media operations and content are tightly controlled, and the CCP, primarily through its Central Propaganda Department, determines what appears in news reports. Controlling media content allows the CCP to disseminate propaganda supportive of government policies, censor controversial news stories, and have reports published criticizing political adversaries of the CCP. China Central Television (CCTV) has traditionally served as a major national conduit for televised propaganda, while the People's Daily, the official newspaper of the Central Committee of the Chinese Communist Party, has served as a medium for print propaganda. In 2005, Reporters Without Borders published a report about China's official news agency, the Xinhua News Agency, calling it "the world's biggest propaganda agency", and said that it was "at the heart of censorship and disinformation put in place" by the government.

The CPD weekly sends censorship guidelines to prominent editors and media providers and Chinese state media generally employ their own monitors for censorship. While in the past the Central Propaganda Department and its local branches sent faxes to all media throughout the country with instructions indicating subjects that the media should stress or avoid entirely, directives are now imparted to ranking media managers or editors during phone conversations—a move designed to reduce the paper trail. Media in China faces few restrictions on content that is not deemed to be politically damaging.

Wu Xuecan, a former editor of the People's Daily overseas edition, reports that through control of the "ideological domain, material means and living necessities," editors and reporters are conditioned to keep news and reports aligned with the interests of the CCP. Wu further reports that, political study sessions ensures that editors first practice self-censorship. He Qinglian writes that long years of media control have bred in Chinese journalists a habit of "self-discipline," and that most Chinese journalists resign themselves to playing the role of "Party mouthpieces." Control is also directed at sources of information, as ordinary people are restricted from providing news to Chinese media, and more so to foreign media.

=== Thought reform ===
Propaganda and thought work in the Maoist era had a number of distinctive features, according to Brady, such as "ideological remolding" or "thought reform", ideological purges, ritual humiliation of ideological opponents, an emphasis on political study to raise levels of awareness of the current line, and targeting high-profile individuals as symbols of negative tendencies which must be eradicated.

The experiences of propaganda and thought work in the Cultural Revolution provided the CCP with a "profound lesson," according to Brady. Virtually all post-Mao era CCP leaders had been under attack during that time, and drew two seemingly contradictory lessons: the rejection of mass movements and thought reform as means of transforming China, and the recognition of the "vital role of propaganda and thought work in China's political control." The administration of propaganda and thought work was plagued by these issues through the 1980s, and up to the events of 4 June 1989.

Biderman and Meyers wrote in 1968 that while some kind of thought reform is characteristic of all totalitarian regimes, the CCP "set about it more purposefully, more massively, and more intensively than have other ruling groups," including through employing known techniques in new ways. They note the presence of such techniques in Maoist political campaigns, such as daily meetings for criticism and self-criticism; surveillance and sanctions were connected with education to find and correct deficiencies in personal conducts. In the military, political leaders attacked all personal connections between soldiers that were not based on political conviction, thus exploiting social pressures and personal anxieties to build a sense of conformity.

In terms of intensity and scope, spiritual control has been reinforced under the CCP's rule, and has become a basic feature of citizens' daily life, according to Victor Shaw. To an extent, the "freedom of silence" cherished by some older Chinese scholars was not even possible for an illiterate peasant in a remote area under the CCP mass propaganda.

According to Shaw, the CCP utilizes propaganda to spread its policies, build social consensus, and mobilize the population for social programs. Ideological tensions result in mass movements, and the resulting spiritual control legitimizes the political establishment. "Political studies, legal education, heroic models, and thought reform provide the CCP with effective weapons to propagandize rules and legal codes, normalize individual behaviour, and rehabilitate deviants in labor camps."

Kurlantzick and Link stated that the CCP uses the technique of "thoughtwork" (sixiang gongzuo) to maintain popular obedience, dating back to the Mao Zedong era. They noted that while Mao-era campaigns are aimed at transforming the Chinese society and people's natures, the modern approach to thoughtwork are more subtle and only focuses on issues important to the CCP's rule. According to Kurlantzick and Link, it consists largely of cultivating pro-government views in the media and other influential people in Chinese society, and as such complaints against the government becomes distracted with pro-government propaganda. The government also attempts to distance itself from local issues by blaming them on corrupt local officials, says Kurlantzick and Link.

=== Public relations ===
According to Anne-Marie Brady, the Foreign Ministry first set up a system of designated officials to give information in times of crisis in 1983, and greatly expanded the system to lower levels in the mid-1990s. China's spin had been directed only at foreigners, but in the 1990s leaders realized that managing public crises was useful for domestic politics; this included setting up provincial level "News Coordinator Groups," and inviting foreign PR firms to give seminars.

Brady writes that Chinese foreign propaganda officials took cues from the Blair government's spin doctoring during the mad cow disease crisis of 2000–2001, and the Bush government's use of the U.S. media after the terrorist attacks of 11 September 2001. According to her, the Blair model allows for a certain amount of negative coverage to be shown during a crisis, which is believed to help release some of the "social tension" surrounding it. She believes information managers in China used this approach during coal mining disasters of 2005. According to Brady, trained official spokespeople are now available on call in every central government ministry, as well as in local governments, to deal with emerging crises; these spin doctors are coordinated and trained by the Office of Foreign Propaganda, externally named the SCIO.

Instead of attempting a media blackout as with the 2008 Tibetan unrest, the CCP has adopted a series of more advanced techniques to influence the information leaving China. The day after violence in Ürümqi, the SCIO set up a Xinjiang Information Office in Ürümqi to assist foreign reporters. It invited foreign media to Xinjiang to tour the riot zones, visit hospitals, and look at the aftermath themselves. Journalists were also given CDs with photos and TV clips. "They try to control the foreign journalists as much as possible by using this more sophisticated PR work rather than ban[ning] them," according to academic Xiao Qiang, quoted by Newsweek.

== Propaganda on the internet ==
Traditionally, the CCP propaganda apparatus had been based around suppressing news and information, but this often meant the Party found itself in a reactive posture, according to Chinese media expert David Bandurski. In later years the internet played a key role in the spread of propaganda to Chinese diaspora. PRC-based Internet sites remain a leading source of Chinese-language and China-related news for overseas Chinese. The internet is an extremely effective tool for guiding and organizing overseas Chinese public opinion, according to Anne-Marie Brady.

Brady cites an example of the role of the internet in organizing popular protests by overseas Chinese, its usage by the state against a perceived bias of the Western media in its coverage of 2008 Tibetan unrest and, a month later, in organizing a series of worldwide demonstrations in support of China during the Olympic torch relay. Brady noted that these protests were genuine and popular, demonstrating the effectiveness of China's efforts to rebuild positive public opinion within the Chinese overseas diaspora, but the demonstrations nevertheless received official support both symbolically and in practice. While there was no compulsion for overseas Chinese to attend the rallies, those who did were given free T-shirts, souvenirs, transport, and accommodation, donated by local embassy officials and China-based donors.

=== 50 Cent Party ===
The Chinese government regularly uses fake social media accounts and posts to attempt to shape online dialogue and steer discussions away from sensitive topics. This is done by specially trained internet users who comment on blogs, public forums, or wikis, to shift the debate in favor of the CCP and influence public opinion. They are sometime called the "50-cent party" – named so because they are allegedly paid 50 Chinese cents for each comment supporting the CCP they make, though some speculate that they are probably not paid anything for the posts, instead being required to do so as a part of their official party duties.

An internal government document released by the BBC outlines the requirements for those employed as online posters, which include having "relatively good political and professional qualities, and have a pioneering and enterprising spirit", being able to react quickly, etc.

It is believed that such government-sponsored Internet commentators have now become widespread and their numbers could be in the tens of thousands; David Bandurski suggests the number may be up to 280,000 while The Guardian puts the estimate as 300,000. According to The Guardian, the growth in popularity of such astroturfing owes to the ease with which web 2.0 technologies such as Twitter, Wikipedia and YouTube can be employed to sway public opinion. The BBC News reports that special centers have been set up to train China's 'army of internet spin doctors'. Data analysis of social media activity and leaked government emails by a team led by Gary King at Harvard's Institute for Quantitative Science showed that, in the mid-2010s, the Chinese government generated over 440 million posts every year through such accounts.

=== Wikipedia ===
On 13 September 2021, the Wikimedia Foundation banned seven Wikipedia users and removed administrator privileges from twelve users that were part of Wikimedians of Mainland China (WMC). Maggie Dennis, the foundation's vice present of community resilience and sustainability, said that there had been an yearlong investigation into infiltration concerns. Dennis observed that the infiltrators had tried to promote "the aims of China, as interpreted through whatever filters they may bring to bear". Dennis said, "we needed to act based on credible information that some members (not all) of that group [WMC] have harassed, intimidated, and threatened other members of our community, including in some cases physically harming others, in order to secure their own power and subvert the collaborative nature of our projects".

== Domestic propaganda ==
Within the doctrine of China's peaceful rise resorting to Peace Journalism has been analyzed as a growing trend in China's strategy for domestic propaganda, in particular in covering news from Xinjiang. After Zbigniew Brzezinski's having termed Central Asia the "Global Balkans" Idriss Aberkane has argued the resorting to unilateral, state-endorsed Peace Journalism could be a way for China to "de-balkanize" Xinjiang. This he has called "coercive Peace Journalism".

Peace journalism does not sell well because it typically proscribes the coverage of a conflict by news eliciting strong emotional reactions. Man becomes easily addicted to strong emotions and this has played a central role in peace journalism's failure at being adopted by mainstream media. On the other hand, mainstream media badly need (and compete with each other) to provide the strongest emotional value to their audience and this has become a vital part of their business model. Yet in China the media industry is not driven by returns on financial investments but by returns on political interests. Thus paradoxically promoting Peace Journalism is much easier for the PRC than say for countries of the European Union as in promoting a political agenda the former can afford to broadcast news with low emotional weight, especially in a non-competitive environment for its media industry.

The Chinese government has used its public evaluations of historical, public figures as a means of communicating to the Chinese public the traits and political goals that it considers desirable and undesirable. The Chinese government has historically tended towards evaluating public figures either as villains or heroes, leaving little room for interpretation and making it clear whether the traits and goals of individual figures should be emulated or despised. The public image of some figures, including Peng Dehuai, have undergone radical reverses throughout the history of the PRC, as required by CCP propagandists: Peng was portrayed as a subhuman villain during the Cultural Revolution; but, since 1978, has been evaluated as a nearly perfect Marxist, general, and public official.

By examining the qualities associated with public figures whose images have been manipulated to make those figures either exaggeratedly positive or exaggeratedly negative symbols, scholars have developed a number of assumptions about the traits and political goals generally desired by various PRC governments. Figures whose images have been manipulated to make them positive symbols will be portrayed as: coming from proletarian or semi-proletarian backgrounds; being courageous, fair, straightforward, and honest in their treatment of subordinates and superiors; leading a simple and frugal life; demonstrating great concern for the "masses"; achieving outstanding professional success; and, being impeccably loyal to the CCP and to the communist cause. Figures whose images have been manipulated to make them negative symbols will be portrayed as: coming from backgrounds which have exposed them to "bourgeoise" thoughts and attitudes; adhering to all or most historical attempts to oppose political figures in the PRC who later became powerful, which are also vilified; being professionally inept, only succeeding temporarily or appearing to succeed through trickery or deception; participating in "conspiracies" against the correct leadership of the CCP; cooperating with "foreign countries" (historically either the Soviet Union or the United States, depending on which is more threatening at the time); and, having numerous negative traits, such as opportunism or corruption. Usually, public figures will provide considerable examples of either positive or negative qualities, but will be made to fit either a positive or negative stereotype through exaggerating qualities which support the interpretation desired by the CCP, and by omitting from the historical narrative qualities which contradict the CCP's intended interpretation.

As part of the "Propaganda Teaching Team" (xuan jiang tuan), tens of thousands of CCP cadre routinely travel from China's urban areas to rural China to engage in xuanchuan activities at the grassroots level.

== External propaganda ==
The Chinese state refers to all media work abroad as wai xuan, or "external propaganda." Through its external propaganda operations, frequently directed by the CCP's United Front Work Department, China seeks to shape international perception of the Chinese government and its policies to "allay concerns about China's economic rise, military build-up and increasing political and diplomatic influence." Specifically by:

1. Reducing fears that China is a threat to neighboring countries. China seeks to change its image within the region from that of a growing threat and aggressor to that of a benefactor and potential partner. Beijing is working to "diminish fears of China's future military power, or concerns that China's massive economic growth would divert trade and foreign investment from other nations."
2. Securing access to resources and energy. As China's economy continues to grow at a rapid pace, the need for resources and energy has become more pressing. To protect its access to these resources, China is working to gain the trust of foreign states that possess oil, gas, and other materials.
3. Building alliances and weaken Taiwan's relationship with the international community. In 1994, China announced that it would "use all economic and diplomatic resources to reward countries that are willing to isolate Taiwan." Through propaganda as well as economic incentives, China seeks to convince any nation that still recognizes Taiwan to switch their loyalty to Beijing and formally declare that Taiwan is part of China.
4. Promoting a multipolar world and constrain U.S. global power. China seeks to slowly diminish the United States' influence in Asia, and create its own sphere of influence in Southeast Asia.

In a 2008 report, the U.S. State Department's International Security Advisory Board declared that China was in the midst of a "comprehensive strategic deception campaign," which was said to include "Psychological Warfare (propaganda, deception, and coercion), Media Warfare (manipulation of public opinion domestically and internationally), and Legal Warfare (use of 'legal regimes' to handicap the opponent in fields favorable to him)." On its official Chinese Web site, CCTV describes itself as "the mouthpiece of the Party and the government," and lists its main operations under the heading "propaganda situation," referring to new foreign-language channels as "reaching a new stage in external propaganda."

=== CCP propaganda themes ===
Former CCP leader Deng Xiaoping advised Chinese leadership to "hide your capabilities, and bide your time." Most modern Chinese foreign propaganda seeks to pursue China's strategic goals while adhering to this advice. The following themes were stated by Zheng Bijian to be characteristic of China's foreign propaganda prior to Xi Jinping:

- China seeks a peaceful rise. In other words, "China is not a threat." As it industrializes, China does not seek to rival other nations for resources. It also seeks to industrialize without high amounts of pollution, energy consumption, and investment.
- China does not seek hegemony. "Instead, China will transcend ideological differences to strive for peace, development, and cooperation with all countries of the world." China "advocates a new international political and economic order, one that can be achieved through incremental reforms and the democratization of international relations."
- The CCP is evolving and is no longer an authoritarian regime. China's government has evolved from the days of Mao Zedong. It is no longer a strict, authoritarian style Communist/Maoist system, but is democratizing. The CCP seeks to "transcend outdated modes of social control and to construct a harmonious socialist society."
- China does not view the United States as a strategic adversary. Instead, "Beijing wants Washington to play a positive role in the region's security as well as economic affairs."

External propaganda efforts have since shifted to denigrating liberal democracy and stoking anti-American sentiment.

=== Instruments ===
The PRC uses many tactics and techniques to disseminate its propaganda themes abroad. China uses its news and media outlets, which are directly influenced by various state organizations (and ultimately the Central Propaganda Department of the CCP), to relay news stories consistent with these themes to foreign audiences. In 2009, reports emerged that China intends to invest US$6.6 billion to expand its foreign language news service. This includes plans for a 24-hour English-language news network to discuss world affairs from Beijing's point of view. A 2015 investigative report by Reuters found a network of at least 33 radio stations in 14 countries that obscures China Radio International (CRI) as its majority shareholder. A significant portion of the programming on these stations is either produced or provided by CRI, or by media firms CRI controls in the United States, Australia, and Europe. In the 2020s, state media outlets have increasingly created "media studios" focused on foreign "public opinion guidance" and run by small teams that obscure state or party ownership.

==== Public diplomacy ====
Soon after the 1949 founding of the People's Republic of China, the Chinese Communist Party institutionalized its view of public diplomacy as "people's diplomacy" (renmin waijiao). People's diplomacy was expressed through the slogan, "influence the policy through the people." Pursuant to its people's diplomacy, China sent doctors, scientists, and athletes to developing countries in Asia to cultivate ties. This form of people's diplomacy was often executed through the Chinese Communist Party's International Liaison Department.

==== International communication centers ====
International communication centers (ICC, Chinese: 国际传播中心) are state media institutions established by provinces and cities of the People's Republic of China. They operate under the supervision of the Central Propaganda Department of the Chinese Communist Party, with state media outlets such as China Daily, Xinhua News Agency, and China News Service providing infrastructure and serving as a partner to many. The first ICCs were established in 2018 in response to General Secretary of the Chinese Communist Party Xi Jinping's call to "innovate" foreign-directed propaganda. According to Qiushi, the theoretical journal of the Chinese Communist Party (CCP), ICCs are "developed based on local propaganda needs" and aim to be a "new force" in the party's global propaganda ecosystem.

==== Influencers ====
China has commonly used influencers to spread state narratives on social media such as TikTok, YouTube, Instagram and Facebook. Many of these profiles belong to reporters of Chinese state media such as CGTN, China Radio International or Xinhua, but identify themselves as influencers or bloggers. Often, these influencers are women and post photos and videos of China which promote it as an idyllic travel destination. According to a 2022 report by Miburo, a firm tracking foreign disinformation operations, at least 200 influencer accounts with connections to the Chinese government or state media were operating across 38 different languages. Some of these accounts have been labeled as state-controlled media on Facebook. Influencers from regions such as Inner Mongolia and Tibet have been used to whitewash human rights abuses taking place there. China has also paid influencers from foreign nations, including from Taiwan, to travel to China and produce positive content about the country.

==== Generative AI ====
Spamouflage, an online disinformation and propaganda campaign of the Ministry of Public Security, has used news anchors created with generative AI to deliver fake news clips. According to a 2025 report by Graphika, generative artificial intelligence is used to launder articles from Chinese state media such as CGTN through various social media sites in an attempt to disguise the articles' origin.

=== Soft power initiatives ===
Since 2005, CCP General Secretary Hu Jintao has promoted a "soft power initiative" aimed at increasing China's influence overseas through cultural and language programs. These trends have been identified by the American Council of Foreign Relations, which describes that "Beijing is trying to convince the world of its peaceful intentions, secure the resources it needs to continue its soaring economic growth, and isolate Taiwan." The article points out that adverse effects of soft power, that "China has the potential to become the 600-pound gorilla in the room," and that "Chinese influence may begin to breed resentment."

The CCP Politburo Standing Committee members Li Changchun and Liu Yunshan have repeatedly stressed that Chinese propaganda should be equally spread both domestically and internationally, and Li Changchun stated that the Confucius Institutes are "an important channel to glorify Chinese culture, to help Chinese culture spread to the world", which is "part of China's foreign propaganda strategy".

The Economist noted that Confucius Institutes are used to project China's soft power and win the support of an external audience, and Confucius was specifically chosen to cast an image of peace and harmony. Such centers are partially sponsored by the Chinese government, with a hands-off approach to management, its directors being directly appointed by their attached universities.

In 2009, Chinese state media launched the English-language version of the Global Times, a nationalistic tabloid under the auspices of the People's Daily. It was described as a part of a larger push by the Chinese government to have a greater say in international media, as well as supplanting what it considers to be biased Western media sources.

In early 2011, the Chinese government launched a million dollar advertising campaign, which was aimed to improve the "incomplete understandings" the American public has about China. A 60-second ad was shown at New York's Times Square, which featured Chinese personalities such as scientist Sun Jiadong, singer Liu Huan and news anchor Jing Yidan, ending with the message of "Chinese Friendship". Newsweek noted the ad's great production values, but criticized it as confusing and explaining little about the featured Chinese identities. China scholar David Shambaugh, a professor at George Washington University, says that "the scale of Beijing's [propaganda] push is unprecedented" and estimates that "China spends $10bn a year on external propaganda".

Since 2018, provincial and municipal-level international communication centers (ICCs) have been established to "innovate" foreign-directed propaganda. Each ICC has tended to take on a specific geographic area of focus for its propaganda initiatives.

In 2025, China was noted for its increased use of paid trips for foreign influencers as part of a soft power strategy.

== Propaganda in the arts ==
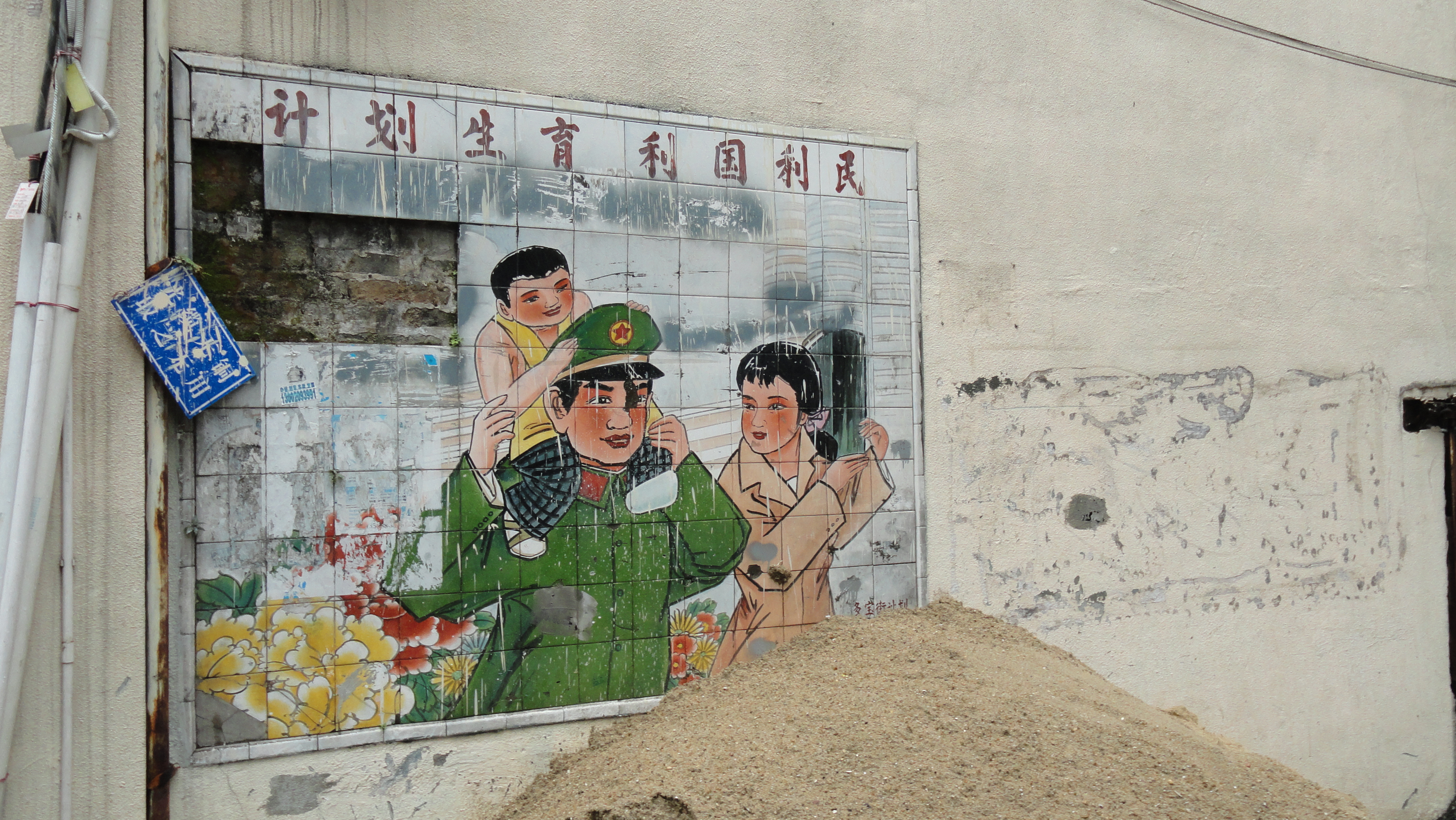
An old propaganda painting in Guangzhou promoting the one-child policy

As in the Soviet Union, the CCP under Mao Zedong took socialist realism as its basis for art, making clear its goal was the 'education' of the people in CCP ideology. This included, as during the Cultural Revolution, transforming literature and art to serve these ends. Pre-revolutionary songs and operas were banned as a poisonous legacy of the past. Middle and high schools were targeted by one campaign because the students circulated romance and love stories among themselves.

Maoist propaganda art has been remade and modernized for almost two decades, and old Cultural Revolution era propaganda productions have appeared in new formats such as DVDs and karaoke versions. They appear in rock and pop versions of revolutionary songs in praise of Mao, as well as T-shirts, watches, porcelain, and other memorabilia. The works of propaganda from the Cultural Revolution have been selling extremely well in recent years, largely for nostalgia, social, patriotic or entertainment purposes.

Propaganda songs and music, such as guoyue and revolutionary opera, have a long and storied history in the PRC, featuring prominently in the popular culture of the 1950s to the 1970s. Many of these songs were collected and performed as modern rock adaptations for several albums that were released during the 1990s, including Red Rock and Red Sun: Mao Zedong Praise Songs New Revolutionary Medley. The latter sold 6–10 million copies in China. Most of the older songs praise Mao, the CCP, the 1949 revolution, the Chinese Red Army and the People's Liberation Army, the unity of the ethnic groups of China, and the various ethnic groups' devotion to Mao and the CCP.

In recent times, films and documentaries such as Silent Contest, Amazing China, The Founding of a Party, Republic and Army has become the new staple of Chinese propaganda, known as "main melody" films.

=== Famous propaganda works ===
==== Novel ====
Red Crag, a famous 1961 Chinese novel featuring underground CCP agents fighting an espionage battle against the Kuomintang.

==== Sculpture ====
Rent Collection Courtyard, a 1965 sculpture depicting former landlord Liu Wencai as an evil landlord collecting rent from poor, although this depiction has been disputed by modern accounts.

==== Films and plays ====
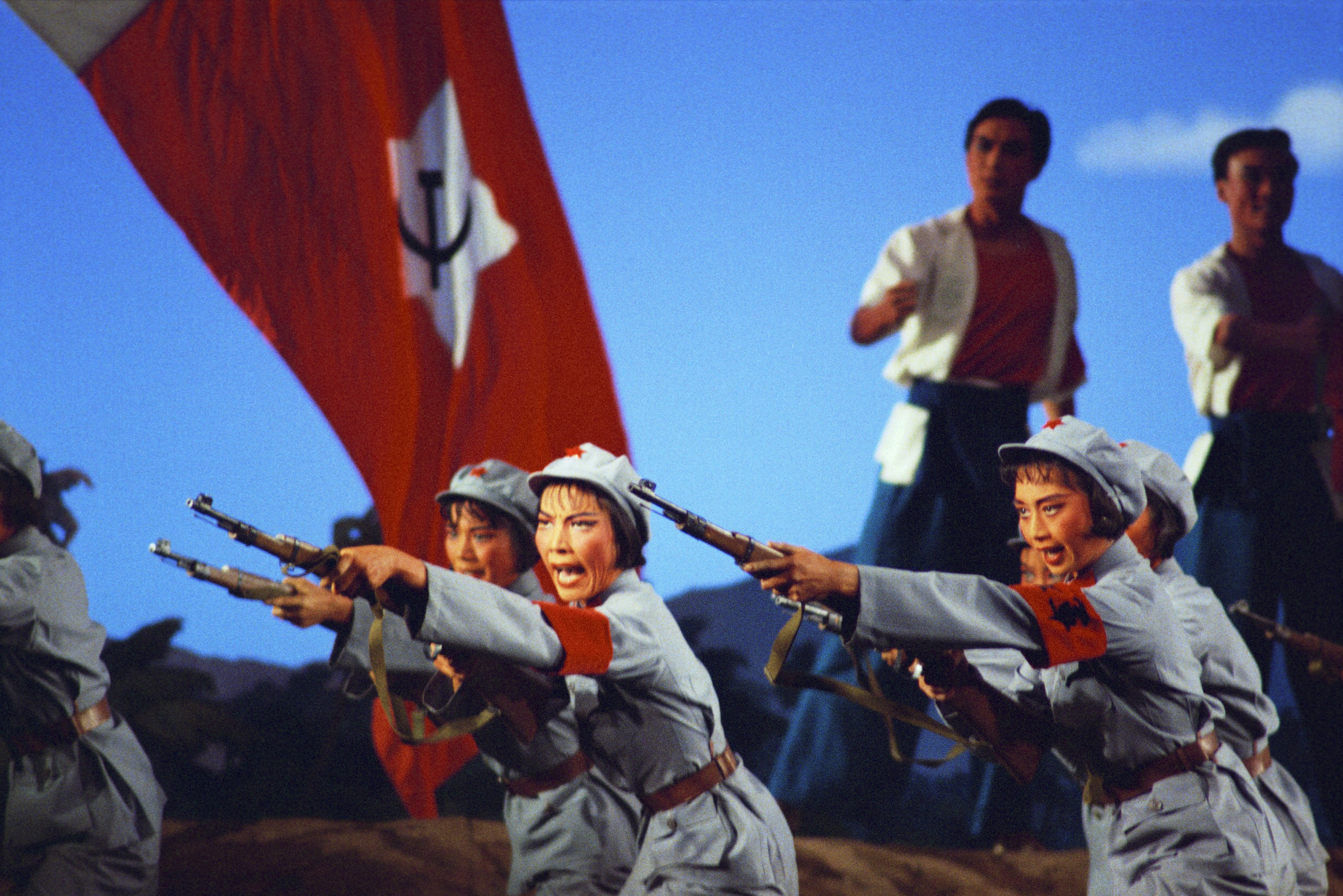
The Red Detachment of Women

- Battle on Shangganling Mountain, a 1956 Chinese war film also known as Shangganling Battle (Chinese: 上甘岭战役), depicting the Battle of Triangle Hill during the Korean War.
- The East Is Red, a 1965 song and dance film performed in the People's Great Hall depicting the history of China from the Boxer Rebellion to the Chinese Communist Revolution.
- China Salesman, a 2017 film about China helping out Africa with 3G technology, starring American actors Steven Seagal and Mike Tyson. It featured China flag waving and celebrating how great China is.
- The Battle at Lake Changjin, a 2021 film set during the Korean War about Chinese troops defeating American troops. It is the second highest-grossing film of 2021 worldwide, behind Spider-Man: No Way Home and ahead of No Time to Die and Shang-Chi and the Legend of the Ten Rings.
- The Eight model plays (八个样板戏), revolutionary themed operas and ballets, were the only ones allowed to be performed during the Cultural Revolution.
  - Taking Tiger Mountain by Strategy (智取威虎山), a play about CCP soldiers infiltrating a bandit camp during the Chinese Civil War.
  - The Legend of the Red Lantern (红灯记), a play based on the activities of the CCP resistance against Japan in Hulin during the Second Sino-Japanese War.
  - Red Detachment of Women (红色娘子军), a pre-Cultural Revolution-era play, later extolled during the Cultural Revolution, about the women of Hainan Island who rose up in resistance on behalf of the CCP
  - The White Haired Girl (白毛女), a play exploring the miseries of China peasants in 1930's China.

==== Songs ====
The titles of some of the more well-known propaganda songs are as follows:

- "Nanniwan" (《南泥湾》/《南泥灣》), a 1943 revolutionary song
- "The East is Red" (《东方红》/《東方紅》), the de facto national anthem of the PRC during the Cultural Revolution
- "Socialism is Good" (《社会主义好》), a modern rock adaptation of which was performed by Zhang Qu and featured on the 1990s album Red Rock.
- "Battle Hymn of the Chinese People's Volunteers" (《中国人民志愿军战歌》/《中國人民志願軍戰歌》) – a well-known song from the Korean War period
- "Red Sun Shining Over the Border" (《红太阳照边疆》/《紅太陽照邊疆》) – a song from the Yanbian Korean Autonomous Prefecture in Jilin Province
- "A Wa People Sing New Songs" (阿佤唱新歌曲) – a song attributed to the Wa ethnic minority of Yunnan
- "Laundry Song" (《洗衣歌》) – a song celebrating the liberation of Tibet
- "Liuyang River" (《浏阳河》) – a song about a river near Mao Zedong's hometown of Shaoshan in Hunan
- "Saliha Most Follows the Words of Chairman Mao" (《萨利哈听毛主席的话》/《薩利哈最聽毛主席的話》) – a song attributed to the Kazakh minority of the Xinjiang
- "The Never-Setting Sun Rises Over the Grassland" (《草原上升起不落的太阳》/草原上升起不落的太陽 – ) from Inner Mongolia
- "Xinjiang is Good" (新疆好) – attributed to the ethnic Uyghurs of Xinjiang
- "I Love Beijing Tiananmen" (《我爱北京天安门》/《我愛北京天安門》) – claimed to have been translated into over 50 languages, this song is frequently taught to schoolchildren in the PRC
- "Zhuang Brocade Dedicated to Chairman Mao" (莊錦獻給毛主席) – a song attributed to the Zhuang ethnic minority of the Guangxi Zhuang Autonomous Region
- "Sweet-Scented Osmanthus Blooms With the Arrival of Happiness" (《桂花开放幸福来》) (attributed to the Miao, or Chinese Hmong, ethnic minority group)
- "Generations Remember Chairman Mao's Kindness" (《世世代代铭记毛主席的恩情》) (a song celebrating the "liberation of the ethnic Xibe people")
- "Salaam Chairman Mao" (《萨拉姆毛主席》/《薩拉姆毛主席》) – a Xinjiang song praising Mao, composed by Wang Luobin. A modern version was performed by Chinese rock singer Dao Lang.
- "Song of Mount Erlangshan" (《歌唱二郎山》) – a 1950s song celebrating the development of Tibet, which made Mount Erlangshan in western Sichuan famous
- "Story of the Spring" (春天的故事) – a song performed by Dong Wenhua, initially at the 1997 CCTV New Year's Gala, days before his death, dedicated to late Chinese leader Deng Xiaoping
- "The Cultural Revolution is Just Great" (《无产阶级文化大革命就是好》/《無產階級文化大革命就是好》) – a song praising the Cultural Revolution
- "On the Golden Mountains of Beijing" (北京的金山上) – a song attributed to the Tibetan people praising Mao as the shining sun
- "Ode to the Socialist Motherland" (《歌唱社会主义祖国》/《歌唱社會主義祖國》) – the Cultural Revolution-era modification of the well-known patriotic song "Ode to the Motherland" (《歌唱祖国》/《歌唱祖國》).
- "Where are you going, Uncle Kurban?" (库尔班大叔您上哪儿) – a song attributed to a Uyghur elder named Kurban Tulum (also known as Uncle Kurban) praising People's Liberation Army.

Most of the songs listed above are no longer used as propaganda by the CCP, but are exhibited in China as a means of reviving popular nostalgia for the "old times".
