= Foreign Correspondents' Club of China =

- 驻华外国记者协会
- Formation: 1981; 45 years ago
- Headquarters: Beijing, China
- Website: fccchina.org

The Foreign Correspondents' Club of China (FCCC; Chinese: 驻华外国记者协会) is the professional organization of foreign journalists based in Beijing, China.

In July 2018, because FCCC was not officially registered, the Chinese government considered the organization to be an illegal organization.

== History ==
The club was established in 1981 as the Foreign Correspondents Club of Beijing.

In January 2019, the FCCC published a report titled "Under Watch: Reporting in China's Surveillance State" that outlined a significant crackdown on reporting, particularly in Xinjiang.

In January 2022, the FCCC published a report outlining how foreign journalists in China were subject to rising intimidation by the Chinese government.

In February 2022, the FCCC condemned treatment of foreign journalists covering the 2022 Winter Olympics in Beijing. These included government interference with interviews and online attacks, along with physical altercations against journalists by security.
