= Chinese Communist Party News Network =

Chinese Communist Party website

- Screenshot of the CPC News Network on 15 December 2025.
- Website type: News
- Available in: Mandarin Chinese, Mongolian, Tibetan, Uyghur, Kazakh, Korean, Yi, and Zhuang
- Founded: July 1, 2006; 20 years ago
- Owner: People's Daily Online
- Website: cpc.people.com.cn
- Current status: Active

Chinese Communist Party News Network
- Simplified Chinese: 中国共产党新闻网
- Traditional Chinese: 中國共產黨新聞網
Transcriptions
Standard Mandarin
- Hanyu Pinyin: Zhōngguó Gòngchǎndǎng Xīnwén wǎng

The Chinese Communist Party News Network is a news website of the Central Committee of the Chinese Communist Party and hosted by the People's Daily Press and People's Daily Online.

== History ==
On July 1, 2006, at the 85th anniversary of the founding of the Chinese Communist Party, the Chinese Communist Party News Network was officially launched. As part of the Party's Mass Line Education and Practice Activities campaign in 2021, the website sorted out the "tips" for learning, hoping to help CCP members.

== Content ==
The website is run by the People's Daily Online. In addition to Mandarin Chinese, the website has Mongolian, Tibetan, Uyghur, Kazakh, Korean, Yi, and Zhuang editions.
