= Li Qihong =

Mayor of Zhongshan

Li Qihong 李启红 (李啟紅)

Mayor of Zhongshan (Acting)
- In office December 2006 – January 2007
- Preceded by: Chen Genkai
- Succeeded by: Li Qihong

Mayor of Zhongshan
- Incumbent
- Assumed office January 2007
- Preceded by: Li Qihong

Personal details
- Born: April 1954 (age 71) Zhongshan, Guangdong
- Party: Chinese Communist Party
- Spouse: Lin Yong'an

Li Qihong (simplified Chinese: 李启红; traditional Chinese: 李啟紅; pinyin: Lǐ Qǐhóng; born April 1954 in Zhongshan, Guangdong) is the current Chinese Communist Party Deputy Committee Secretary of Zhongshan and mayor of Zhongshan.

== Biography ==
She masters a postgraduate degree from Party School of the Guangdong Provincial Committee of the Chinese Communist Party. She began working in June 1968 and joined the Chinese Communist Party in August 1974.

Political offices
Preceded by Chen Genkai	Mayor of Zhongshan; December 2006–January 2007 (Acting); January 2007–	Succeeded by Incumbent
