= Fan Zhengwei =

Chinese journalist

- 范正伟

President and Communist Party Secretary of Global Times
- Incumbent
- Assumed office December 2021
- President: Himself
- Preceded by: Hu Xijin

Personal details
- Born: August 1980 (age 46) Suide County, Shaanxi, China
- Party: Chinese Communist Party
- Education: Peking University

Chinese name
- Simplified Chinese: 范正伟
- Traditional Chinese: 范正偉
Transcriptions
Standard Mandarin
- Hanyu Pinyin: Fàn Zhèngwěi

Fan Zhengwei (Chinese: 范正伟; born 1980) is a Chinese journalist and the current party secretary and president of Global Times, a tabloid under the auspices of the Chinese Communist Party's official People's Daily newspaper, since December 2021.

== Biography ==
Fan was born in Suide County, Shaanxi, in 1980. He attended Peking University, graduating with a bachelor's degree in literature and master's degree in law. In December 2021, he was appointed party secretary and president of Global Times, succeeding Hu Xijin.

Party political offices
| Preceded by Hu Xijin | Communist Party Secretary of Global Times; 2021–present | Incumbent |
Media offices
| New title | President of Global Times; 2021–present | Incumbent |
