= Guangdong Provincial Committee of the Chinese Communist Party =

Guangdong Provincial Committee of the Chinese Communist Party 中国共产党广东省委员会

Overview
- Type: Highest decision-making organ when Guangdong Provincial Congress is not in session.
- Elected by: Guangdong Provincial Congress
- Length of term: Five years
- Term limits: None
- First convocation: 1 July 1955
- Secretary: Huang Kunming
- Deputy Secretary: Wang Weizhong (Governor); Feng Zhonghua
- Executive organ: Standing Committee
- Inspection organ: Commission for Discipline Inspection

Meeting place
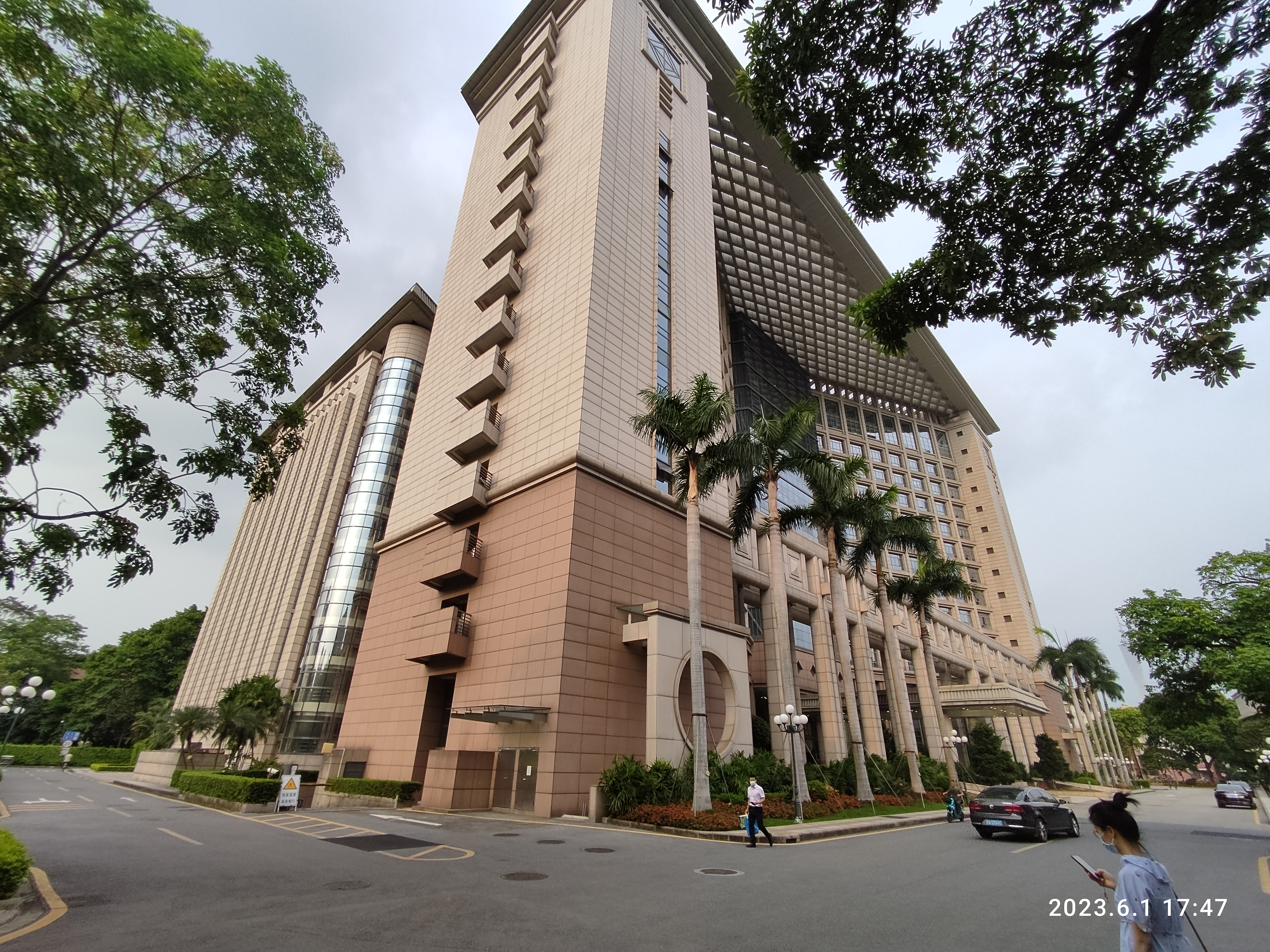
- Guangdong Provincial Committee Building in Guangzhou

Guangdong Provincial Committee of the Chinese Communist Party
- Simplified Chinese: 中国共产党广东省委员会
- Traditional Chinese: 中國共產黨廣東省委員會
Transcriptions
Standard Mandarin
- Hanyu Pinyin: Zhōngguó Gòngchǎndǎng Guǎngdōngshěng Wěiyuánhuì

Abbreviation
- Simplified Chinese: 中共广东省委
- Traditional Chinese: 中共廣東省委
- Literal meaning: CCP Guangdong Provincial Committee
Transcriptions
Standard Mandarin
- Hanyu Pinyin: Zhōnggòng Guǎngdōngshěng Wěi

The Guangdong Provincial Committee of the Chinese Communist Party is the provincial committee of the Chinese Communist Party (CCP) in Guangdong. The CCP committee secretary is the highest ranking post in the province. The current secretary is Huang Kunming, a member of the CCP Politburo, who succeeded Li Xi on 28 October 2022.

== Organization ==
The organization of the Guangdong Provincial Committee includes:

- General Office

=== Functional departments ===
- Organization Department
- Publicity Department
- United Front Work Department
- Political and Legal Affairs Commission
- Social Work Department

=== Offices ===
- Policy Research Office
- Office of the Cyberspace Affairs Commission
- Office of the Foreign Affairs Commission
- Office of the Institutional Organization Commission
- Office of the Military-civilian Fusion Development Committee
- Taiwan Work Office
- Office of the Leading Group for Inspection Work
- Bureau of Veteran Cadres

=== Dispatched institutions ===
- Working Committee of the Organs Directly Affiliated to the Guangdong Provincial Committee
- Guangdong-Macao In-depth Cooperation Zone in Hengqin Working Committee

=== Organizations directly under the committee ===
- Guangdong Party School
- Nanfang Daily Media Group
- Guangdong Institute of Socialism
- Party History Research Office
- Guangdong Provincial Archives

== Leadership ==
The secretary of the committee is the highest office in Guangdong, being superior to the governor of the province. Since at least 2007, the secretary has consistently been a member of the CCP Politburo.

=== Party Committees ===
12th Provincial Party Committee (May 2017–May 2022)

- Secretary: Hu Chunhua (until October 2017), Li Xi (from October 2017)
- Deputy Secretaries: Ma Xingrui (until December 2021), Ren Xuefeng (until October 2018), Wang Weizhong (from December 2018), Meng Fanli (from April 2022)
- Other Standing Committee members: Shen Haixiong (until February 2018), Lin Shaochun (until March 2019), Zou Ming (until March 2019), He Zhongyou (until December 2019), Shi Kehui (until January 2021), Jiang Ling (until July 2018), Yan Zhichan (until September 2017), Zeng Zhiquan (until July 2018, put under investigation), Zhang Liming (January 2018–June 2021), Fu Hua (March 2018–April 2020), Zhang Shuofu (July 2018–December 2021), Ye Zhenqin (from December 2018), Huang Ningsheng (from January 2019), Zheng Yanxiong (January 2019–July 2020), Zhang Yizhen (February 2019–November 2021), Lin Keqing (from December 2019), Zhang Fuhai (from May 2020), Zhang Hu (from June 2020), Song Fulong (from February 2021), Chen Jianwen (from March 2021), Wang Shouxin (from June 2021)

13th Provincial Party Committee (May 2022–)

- Secretary: Li Xi (until October 2022), Huang Kunming (from October 2022)
- Deputy Secretaries: Wang Weizhong, Meng Fanli
- Other Standing Committee members: Lin Keqing (until June 2023), Song Fulong, Zhang Fuhai (until October 2022), Chen Jianwen, Zhang Hu, Wang Xi, Yuan Gujie, Zhang Xiaoqiang (until July 2023), Wang Ruijun, Zhou He (September 2022–September 2023), Cheng Fubo (from December 2022), Guo Yonghang (from June 2023), Zhang Gong (from September 2023)

== See also ==
- Politics of Guangdong
