= Qian Liren =

Chinese politician

Qian Liren (born 20 August 1924; simplified Chinese: 钱李仁; traditional Chinese: 錢李仁; pinyin: Qián Lǐrén) is a Chinese politician, diplomat, and translator. Qian had a distinguished career in foreign affairs, and was China's first ambassador to UNESCO, in addition to being the head of the International Department of the Chinese Communist Party between 1983 and 1985. He then served as the head of the People's Daily newspaper, but was removed from the position after the 1989 Tiananmen Square protests and massacre.

== Early life ==
Born in 1924 in Jiaxing, Zhejiang province, Qian is a documented descendant of the kings of Wuyue. After moving with his family to Zhenjiang and later to Shanghai during the Second Sino-Japanese War, Qian attended St. John's University, Shanghai, where he studied chemistry.

== Early career ==
While in secondary school and university, Qian became involved with the anti-Kuomintang student movement and became its leader in Shanghai, becoming president of the Shanghai Secondary Students Association and Secretary of the Shanghai Students Union. He joined the Chinese Communist Party (CCP) in 1940, and became a member of the Shanghai Municipal Committee of the CCP.

After the establishment of the People's Republic of China in 1949, Qian worked in the international affairs department of the Communist Youth League of China. He was its representative to the World Federation of Democratic Youth in Budapest, Hungary, and became Secretary in the Federation secretariat. His Youth League origins have led to Qian being classified as part of the "Youth League faction" of Hu Yaobang. From the Youth League, he was promoted to head the external affairs office of the State Council (1964–1965).

Purged during the Cultural Revolution, Qian was re-appointed in 1974 as a member of the Standing Council of the Chinese People's Association for Friendship with Foreign Countries, and in 1978 was posted as China's first ambassador to UNESCO. Returning to China from Paris, he became the head of the CCP Central Committee's International Liaison Department. This position would conventionally lead to the post of Foreign Minister. For Qian, however, his next posting as the head of the People's Daily Press (1985–1989) spelled the end of his rise within the CCP.

Qian was a member of the 12th and 13th Central Committees of the CCP (1985–1992).

== Tiananmen Square protests and dismissal ==
During the 1989 Tiananmen Square protests and massacre, Qian was the head of the People's Daily, the CCP Central Committee's official newspaper. At the time, the CCP leadership was split between those advocating a conciliatory approach with the students and those advocating a hardline crackdown. During the protests, the newspaper printed several stories which were later regarded by the government as sympathetic of the students. In addition, both Qian and the Editor-in-Chief Tan Wenrui were accused of tolerating pro-student editors, who obliquely attacked the hardliners in their reporting. Specifically, Qian directly authorized a series of reports, titled "Xth day of Martial Law", which was said to mock the hardliners by exaggerating the frivolity in Beijing while under martial law. Its reportage of international news was also said to satirize the hardliners in the CCP leadership.

In its June 4 Edition, the People's Daily made a series of editorial decisions which the government later condemned as oblique criticism of the crackdown. In the international news section, for example, the Gwangju Uprising was reported with a headline, printed in bold type, of "Seoul students go on hunger strike to protest government massacre and crackdown". The headline of a story on Poland was "Warning: no-body should play with fire", with a tagline "Polish leaders say elections are a great experiment in reconciliation". A number of reports on "Convicted criminal becomes People's Representative", and "Judge perverts justice" were also included. The headline "the unconquerable man" was printed in the sports section.

More serious, however, was the "People's Daily Extra incident". Some People's Daily employees under the leadership of editor Wu Xuecan organized the printing of an unauthorized "extra" edition, which re-printed student flyers and took the point of view of the student protestors. Only about 1000 copies were reportedly printed, all of which were distributed to the protesting students. The "extra" was a direct response to the "April 26 Editorial", an article written by hawkish CCP leaders and published in the People's Daily, and which took a hostile attitude to the students. Despite immediately printing a notice that disclaimed the Extra as unauthorized, both Qian and Tan Wenrui were removed from their posts in the purge at the People's Daily that followed the protests.

== Later career ==
Subsequently, Qian did not hold another major government or party position. He was the Vice President of the quasi-official Chinese Association for International Understanding from 1995 to 2003, and acted as advisor to the organization thereafter.

He was a member of the Standing Committee of the Chinese People's Political Consultative Conference (1993–1998) and occasionally acted as its spokesperson. From 1995 to 1998 he was the head of its Foreign Affairs committee.

== Works ==
Qian is fluent in Chinese, English, French and several other European languages. He has rendered into Chinese The August Coup, Mikhail Gorbachev's memoir of that event.

== Personal life ==
Qian married wife Zheng Yun (born Tang Suiqian) in 1952. They have one son and one daughter. He turned 100 on 20 August 2024.

Party political offices
Preceded by Qiao Shi	Head of the International Department of the Chinese Communist Party; 1983–1985	Succeeded by Zhu Liang
Preceded by Qin Chuan	Chief Officer of People's Daily Press; 1985–1989	Succeeded by Gao Di
