= Southern Weekly =

Chinese weekly newspaper

- 在这里读懂中国 (Understand China here.)
- Type: Weekly newspaper (Thur.)
- Format: Broadsheet
- Owner: Guangdong Provincial Committee of the Chinese Communist Party
- Founder: Zuo Fang
- Publisher: Southern Weekly Press
- Editor-in-chief: Huang Can
- Founded: 11 February 1984; 42 years ago
- Political alignment: Chinese Communist Party
- Language: Simplified Chinese
- Headquarters: 289 Central Guangzhou Avenue, Guangzhou, Guangdong
- City: Guangzhou, Guangdong
- Country: China
- Readership: 1.7 million
- Sister newspapers: Southern Daily, etc.
- OCLC number: 47997289
- Website: www.infzm.com

Southern Weekly
- Simplified Chinese: 南方周末
- Traditional Chinese: 南方週末
Transcriptions
Standard Mandarin
- Hanyu Pinyin: Nánfāng Zhōumò
Yue: Cantonese
- Jyutping: naam^{4}fong^{1} zau^{1}mut^{6}

Southern Weekly (Chinese: 南方周末; lit. 'Southern Weekend') is a Chinese weekly newspaper based in Guangzhou, and is a sister publication of the newspaper Nanfang Daily. From the 1990s to the early 2010s, the newspaper was renowned for its investigative journalism, liberal stance, and influence among intellectual readers. The New York Times described the Southern Weekly as "China's most influential liberal newspaper" in 2008. After the 2013 Southern Weekly incident, the newspaper and the market-oriented media it represented began to decline in China.

== History and profile ==
Southern Weekly, founded in 1984, has its head office in Guangzhou, with news bureaus in Beijing, Shanghai and Chengdu. The paper is published by the Nanfang Daily Group under the Guangdong Provincial Committee of the Chinese Communist Party (CCP). It is printed simultaneously in many Chinese cities, and distributed across mainland China.

Southern Weekly currently operates upon 8 key sections: News, Defense, Current Political Situation, Economy, Environment, Culture, Supplement, and Comment, together with an editorial guideline of "Justice, Conscience, Love, Rationality".

Circulation is more than 1.6 million copies, on average, which is said to be the biggest weekly circulation of any newspaper in mainland China. Thus it is considered to be one of the most influential media outlets in China. As of 2007 it had the highest circulation in Beijing.

Prior to the 2013 Southern Weekly incident, the newspaper was known for its outspokenness and liberal editorials. The New York Times has described the Southern Weekly as "China's most influential liberal newspaper". Outlets such as BBC and n+1 have termed the newspaper as one of the country's most respected.

When U.S. President Obama visited China in 2009, he turned down an interview with China Central Television, and instead accepted to talk to Southern Weekly. The interview later turned out to be pale and avoided controversial topics, which was interpreted as the result of authorities' pressure. After Obama then issued a letter to the newspaper praising its commitment to press freedom, the paper was forced to omit it in its report due to government censors. Southern Weekly protested by featuring two large blank spaces on its first two pages.

The paper has built an audience of liberal-minded readers outside Guangdong Province. In 2010, the newspaper was reported to have a larger news bureau and greater circulation in politically charged Beijing than it did in southern China. Because the paper pushes the limits on domestic political reporting, its editors are often fired and replaced.

Meanwhile, being a commercial spin-off of Nanfang Daily in Guangdong Province, Southern Weekly also attracts audiences with entertainment, consumer-oriented lifestyle and sports coverage. In the "China's 500 most valuable brands" released by World Brand Laboratory in 2009, Southern Weekly was ranked at the first position in weekly publications by 4.4 billion RMB of brand value.

In January 2013, the provincial propaganda authorities forced Southern Weekly to run a provided commentary glorifying the CCP in place of the paper's annual new year editorial, which had been a call for proper implementation of the country's constitution. Journalists working at the newspaper publicly objected to this interference – which is an unusual occurrence in China – via Sina Weibo. The CCP's censorship order was believed to have come from provincial propaganda chief Tuo Zhen, a former vice-president of state-run Xinhua News Agency. On 7 January 2013, protesters gathered outside the newspaper's headquarters to support journalists on strike due to censorship, among them, Bill Chou.

== Notable reports ==
Title	Date	Notes
Mou Qizhong Himself and His Hoaxes	29 January 1999	
Putian Faction Series	starting in 1999	
Karamay: A Face Reborned from the Fire	7 January 2000	
Our Grains, Our Future (Drought Special)	26 May 2000	
3 Nobel Prize Winners Excoriated "Nucleic Acid Nutriment" in China	22 February 2001	
Inspection of Zhang Jun Case	19 April 2001	
Commemoration of the 10th Anniversary of the Collapse of the Soviet Communist Party	16 August 2001	
Thousands Kilometers to Track the Forge Letter in Project Hope	29 November 2001	
Commemoration of the 60th Anniversary of the Victory of the War of Resistance Against Japan	1 September 2005	
The Exclusive Interview with Obama	19 November 2009	
Commemoration of the 20th Anniversary of the Collapse of the Soviet Communist Party	18 August 2011	
To Stab That Who Insulted His Mother to Death	23 March 2017	

== Notable events ==
=== 2001 banned book incident ===
Liao Yiwu, the author of The Corpse Walker: Real Life Stories: China From the Bottom Up, a book banned in China which published conversations with China's poorest people, told Voice of America that Southern Weekly's editor-in-chief, deputy-editor-in-chief and director of the newsroom were all sacked for publishing a discussion he had about his book.

=== 2005 Group Resignation Incident ===
Reportedly a large number of journalists quit their jobs to voice anger against the newly elected editor-in-chief, but later the Southern media group published a statement that said this was fake information.

=== 2007 Annual Ceremony Incident ===
In a national gathering that Southern Weekly held in Beijing Bayi Theater, Du Daozheng, the editor of a magazine called Yan Huang Chun Qiu, was awarded the most respectable Chinese media, but a central government propaganda office official called and ordered the award to be canceled. All related shots of the ceremony were also deleted.

=== 2013 New Year Editorial Incident ===
The provincial propaganda authorities forced Southern Weekly to run a provided commentary glorifying the Chinese Communist Party in place of the paper's annual new year editorial, which had been a call for proper implementation of the country's constitution. Journalists on the paper publicly objected to this interference – which is an unusual occurrence in China – via Sina Weibo. The censorship order was believed to have come from provincial propaganda chief Tuo Zhen, a former vice-president of state-run Xinhua.
