= People's Daily during the 1989 Student Movement =

Role of the CCP's official newspaper during the Tiananmen Square protests

The People's Daily is the official newspaper of the Central Committee of the Chinese Communist Party, providing direct information on the policies and positions of the government to its readers. During the 1989 Tiananmen Square protests and massacre, People's Daily played an important role in changing the course of events, especially its April 26 Editorial that provoked great tension between the government and the students when the movement was slowly abating after Hu Yaobang's memorial on April 25. As an official newspaper, its attitude toward the government and the student protestors changed multiple times as the newspaper leadership team had to balance between reporting the truth and staying in line with its higher authority, the Propaganda Department of the Chinese Communist Party, according to the then deputy chief editor, Lu Chaoqi.

== After the death of Hu Yaobang (April 16 to April 25) ==
After Hu's death on April 15, 1989, thousands of students in Beijing gathered together at the Xinhua Gate to commemorate him and his contributions. On April 21, People's Daily published an editorial, "The current big picture is to maintain social stability (维护社会稳定是当前大局)," condemning that "there were a group of people who used the death of Hu as an excuse to attack the party and government" and "a small handful of people incited the troubles and purposely led the general public into social disorder." This pro-government editorial triggered students' dissatisfaction toward dictatorship and corrupted officials, as the editorial intentionally discouraged people from commemorating Hu by picturing the memorials as unlawful demonstrations. Yet, this editorial resulted in more students participating in the strike and memorializing Hu. The situation became more chaotic as a number of criminals in different cities took advantage of the movement to raid shops and attack police officers, reported by the People's Daily on April 24.

== Widening the gulf (April 26 to May 3) ==
On April 26, People's Daily released an important editorial titled "It is necessary to take a clear-cut stand against turmoil (必须旗帜鲜明地反对动乱)." The content was derived from the previous Politburo Standing Committee (PSC) meeting with Deng Xiaoping, which portrayed the student movement as an anti-party, unlawful turmoil that aimed at bringing down the CCP and top leaders. The student protesters, however, viewed the April 26 Editorial as a misinterpretation of their will and asked the government to redefine their pro-democracy movement as a patriotic and lawful protest. Many people viewed this editorial as the turning point of the protest since it enraged the student protestors, leading into a widened gap between the students and the party.

== Support students and ask for journalistic integrity (May 4 to May 19) ==
External image
- People's Daily front-page report on the hunger strike and protest march, May 18, 1989

On the anniversary of the May Fourth Movement, Zhao Ziyang made a conciliatory speech regarding the protests at the Asian Development Bank Conference, and two days later, he made statements suggesting that an opening up of the press might be possible. In response, coverage became more positive, and the People's Daily stopped publishing pieces that were negative in tone. For example, on May 6, People's Daily issued a news article titled "Beijing post-secondary schools gradually resumed classes; Zhao Ziyang's speech received positive responses (首都高校昨日起陆续复课; 赵紫阳讲话引起积极反响)," recognizing the patriotism of the student protestors.

On May 15, Jiang Zemin, then Shanghai's Party Secretary, suspended the World Economic Herald. 102 staff members from the People's Daily along with hundreds of media practitioners signed an open letter to the Shanghai Municipal Party Committee, asking the Shanghai government to revoke the penalties given to Qin Benli and withdraw the Leading Group of Rectification that was in charge of the organization at the time. At a protest on May 17, more than half of the People's Daily staff members took to the streets alongside workers from other state news services, with giant posters with messages such as "Freedom of Press" and "We want to report truth! Don't force us to lie!" and the slogan, "April 26 Editorial was not written by us!"

At this time, People's Daily coverage became highly laudatory and fixated on the students, with 32 articles between May 14 and May 19, of which most were exceedingly positive, and none of which were negative. This continued as students led hunger strikes, from May 17 to May 19, causing massive protests against the government in Beijing. Because of the role People's Daily and other news sources typically had as an official state mouthpiece, and in mass mobilization campaigns during the Cultural Revolution, many interpreted this support as indicative that the government supported the strikers and the protest movement. As a result, support for the movement was perceived to be safe and perhaps even encouraged by the government.

== Reports during the martial law (May 20 to June 2) ==
External image
- The front page of People's Daily on May 22, 1989
- On that day, the People's Daily prominently displayed the news headline "Using troops to solve domestic conflicts is not allowed." in the full-page martial law news.

People inside People's Daily reacted strongly against the official declaration of the martial law on May 20. Qian Liren, the head of the newspaper, approved a series of reports, called "Xth day of Martial Law," which summarized the situation in Beijing each day but only lasted for 10 days due to government pressure. Some hardliners found the content embarrassing, since "the people power had temporarily blocked the advance of troops into the city." In addition, a group of People's Daily employees under editor Wu Xuecan's leadership printed and distributed approximately 1,000 copies of "People's Daily Extra," an unauthorized extra edition that took the point of view of the student protestors. It publicized the fact that Zhao's political power had been deprived and emphasized Zhao's five pieces of advice to the PSC, including negating the April 26 Editorial and investigating in official profiteering. The extra also took a strong position against Li Peng, suggesting the National People's Congress (NPC) to remove Li from his position.

In addition to explicit acts of resistance, the People's Daily writers took to using innuendos to suggest their dissatisfaction with the government's actions. For example, a May 22 report on events in Hungary was placed on the front page, with a quote from the Hungarian Prime Minister as the headline: "Using troops to solve domestic conflicts is not allowed."

== Crackdown and aftermath (June 3 to June 10) ==
In its June 4 edition, People's Daily showed different attitudes under its domestic news and international news section. On its front page, the newspaper issued an editorial titled "Resolutely support the party's decision of suppressing the counter-revolutionary rebellion (坚决拥护党中央决策 坚决镇压反革命暴乱)." On the contrary, under the international news section the newspaper reported on the Gwangju Uprising with the bold headline "Seoul students go on hunger strike to protest government massacre and crackdown" and on the Polish elections held that same day with the headline "Warning: nobody should play with fire" and tagline "Polish leaders say elections are a great experience in reconciliation." Given the context, the government later condemned the editorial decisions made by People's Daily, since the editorials were interpreted by the hardliners as criticisms to the government action and implicit supports to the student protestors. After the crackdown, People's Daily was reorganized by the government with a series of personnel adjustments. Both Qian, Tan Wenrui, then chief editor, and Lu stepped down due to their violation of party discipline and Wu Xuecan was sentenced to 4 years in jail for printing unauthorized extras.

== See also ==
- People's Daily
- April 26 Editorial
