= Chen Genkai =

Chinese politician (born 1950)

Chen Genkai 陈根楷 (陳根楷)

Mayor of Zhongshan
- In office February 1998 – December 2006
- Preceded by: -
- Succeeded by: Li Qihong

Mayor of Zhongshan

Personal details
- Born: December 1950 (age 74–75) Zhongshan, Guangdong
- Party: Chinese Communist Party

Chen Genkai (simplified Chinese: 陈根楷; traditional Chinese: 陳根楷; pinyin: Chén Gēnkǎi; yale: Chan4 Gan1 Gaai1; born December 1950 in Zhongshan, Guangdong) is the current Chinese Communist Party Committee Secretary and Chairman of the Standing Committee of Zhongshan People's Congress. Chen is also known to be the mayor of Zhongshan from 1998 to 2006.

== Profile ==
He began working in 1970 and then joined the Chinese Communist Party.

- Served as Vice Mayor of Zhongshan Municipal People's Government, February 1994 - May 1996.
- Served as Senior Member and Secretary-General of CCP Zhongshan Committee, November 1995 - February 1998.
- Served as Vice Party Secretary of the CCP Zhongshan Committee and Mayor of Zhongshan, February 1998 - December 2006.
- Serving as Party Secretary and Chairman of the CCP Zhongshan Committee, since December 2006.

Political offices
Preceded by -	Mayor of Zhongshan; February 1998–December 2006	Succeeded by Li Qihong
