= Fu Guohao incident =

2019 beating of journalist by protestors in Hong Kong

The Fu Guohao incident occurred during the 2019 Hong Kong protests. At the Hong Kong International Airport, protestors detained, searched, beat, and tied up Global Times journalist Fu Guohao (Chinese: 付国豪). The incident was broadcast on live television. Fu's statement of pro-establishment support during the attack ("I support the Hong Kong police; you can beat me now!") became viral and was widely approved of in mainland Chinese discourses.

== Background ==
The Fu Guohao incident occurred during the 2019 Hong Kong protests. The protests developed following the Hong Kong government's proposal of the Fugitive Offenders and Mutual Legal Assistance in Criminal Matters Legislation (Amendment) Bill 2019, which responded to the murder of Poon Hiu-wing by her boyfriend, a Hong Kong resident, during a tourist trip to Taiwan. No extradition treaty exists between the People's Republic of China and the Taiwan authorities, and therefore the legislation sought to establish a mechanism for the surrender of fugitives to jurisdictions with which Hong Kong SAR does not have formal extradition arrangements. Critics of the legislation contended that it would weaken the one country, two systems principle. Protestors began large-scale actions, including the storming of the Legislative Council and other government buildings and confrontations with Hong Kong police and rival groups resulted.

== Events ==
Fu Guohao was a journalist for the Chinese state-run media outlet Global Times. On 13 August 2019, he attempted to conduct interviews during a protest at Hong Kong International Airport. Protestors challenged Fu to show his press card. When he did not, protestors further questioned him about his identity, searched him, beat him, and tied him up with zip ties. Protestors put a sign on his chest reading, "I am China's police."

The incident was broadcast on live television. Video footage of protestors' attack on Fu showed him shouting, "I support the Hong Kong police; you can beat me now!" (in Chinese) as protestors tied him up. Fu's words became a viral online expression of pro-establishment support among mainland Chinese and were favorably viewed in mainland sentiment.

== Afterwards ==
A common mainland perspective is that protestors' attack on Fu marked a peak in the violence of the protests.

In 2021, three protestors were convicted of the attack on Fu. A fourth was acquitted with the judge determining that video footage of the attack was not sufficiently clear to convict.

Fu died in 2021. His father attributed the death to Fu's depression, describing the beating in Hong Kong as part of a "domino-like" chain.

== See also ==
- Timeline of the 2019–2020 Hong Kong protests (August 2019)
- Safety of journalists
