= Zeng Zhiquan =

Chinese politician (born 1963)

- 曾志权

Head of the United Front Work Department of the Guangdong Provincial Committee of the Chinese Communist Party
- In office April 2018 – July 2018
- Preceded by: Yan Zhichan
- Succeeded by: Huang Ningsheng

Head of the Department of Finance of Guangdong
- In office July 2010 – May 2017
- Preceded by: Liu Kun
- Succeeded by: Dai Yunlong

Personal details
- Born: January 1963 (age 63) Wuhua County, Guangdong, China
- Party: Chinese Communist Party (1984–2019, expelled)
- Education: Zhongnan University of Economics and Law

Chinese name
- Traditional Chinese: 曾志權
- Simplified Chinese: 曾志权
Transcriptions
Standard Mandarin
- Hanyu Pinyin: Zēng Zhìquán

Zeng Zhiquan (Chinese: 曾志权; born January 1963) is a former Chinese politician who served as the Head of the United Front Work Department of the Guangdong Provincial Committee of the Chinese Communist Party. He was dismissed from his position in July 2018 and placed under investigation by the Central Commission for Discipline Inspection and the National Supervisory Commission.

== Career ==
Zeng was born in January 1963, and he was entered to Zhongnan University of Economics, now Zhongnan University of Economics and Law) in 1982. After he graduated from Sichuan Forestry School, he became an officer of Corporate Finance Office of Finance Department of Guangdong. In 1995, Zeng was upgraded to the deputy director of Industry, Transport and Domestic Trade Office of Finance Department, then he was appointed as the Director of Agriculture Office in 2000.

In 2003, Zeng was appointed as the deputy director of Finance Department of Guangdong, and he was upgraded to the Director in 2010. He was elected as the member of the Standing Committee of the CCP Guangdong Committee in 2017.

In April 2018, Zeng was appointed as the Head of the United Front Work Department of the CCP Guangdong Committee.

== Investigation ==
On July 11, 2018, Zeng Zhiquan was placed under investigation by the Central Commission for Discipline Inspection, the CCP's internal disciplinary body, and the National Supervisory Commission, the highest anti-corruption agency of the People's Republic of China, for "serious violations of regulations and laws". He was expelled from the CCP on January 4, 2019.

On April 29, 2019, Zeng stood trial at the Intermediate People's Court of Fuzhou on charges of taking bribes. He was charged with accepting money and goods worth over worth over 140 million yuan (20.8 million U.S. dollars) either by himself or through some of his close relatives. According to the indictment, he allegedly took advantage of his positions to seek benefits for various companies and individuals in project contracting and personnel promotions between 2004 and 2017. On July 9, Zeng was sentenced to life in prison for taking bribes worth 141 million yuan ($20.5 million) by the Fuzhou Intermediate People's Court. He was also deprived of his political rights for life, and ordered by the court to have all his personal assets confiscated and turn over all illicit gains and their interests to the state.

Government offices
Preceded by Liu Kun	Head of the Department of Finance of Guangdong; 2010–2017	Succeeded by Dai Yunlong
Party political offices
Preceded by Yan Zhichan	Head of the United Front Work Department of the CPC Guangdong Committee; 2018	Succeeded by Huang Ningsheng
