= Hu Xijin =

Chinese journalist (born 1960)

- 胡锡进
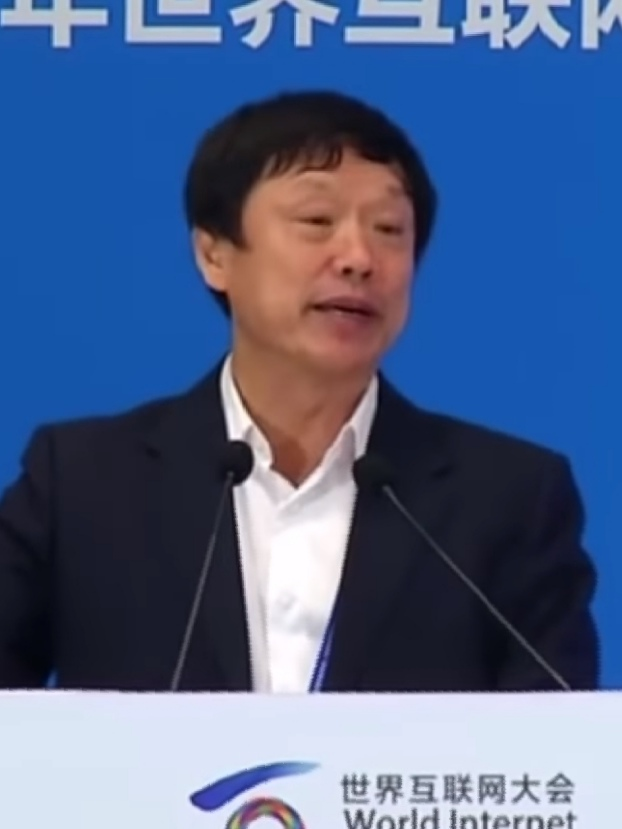
- Hu in 2021

Editor-in-chief and CCP committee secretary of Global Times
- In office 2005–2021
- Editor-in-chief: Himself
- Preceded by: Title established
- Succeeded by: Fan Zhengwei (Party Secretary); Wu Yimin (Editor-in-chief)

Personal details
- Born: April 7, 1960 (age 66) Beijing, China
- Party: Chinese Communist Party
- Children: 1
- Education: People's Liberation Army College of International Relations; Beijing Foreign Studies University
- Occupation: Editor, Journalist
- Hu Xijin's voice in Chinese Hu criticizes Western media at 2021 World Internet Conference

Chinese name
- Simplified Chinese: 胡锡进
- Traditional Chinese: 胡錫進
Transcriptions
Standard Mandarin
- Hanyu Pinyin: Hú Xījìn

Hu Xijin (Chinese: 胡锡进; born 7 April 1960) is a Chinese journalist, who served as the editor-in-chief of Global Times from 2005 to 2021. A popular opinion leader in China, Hu is known for his provocative writing style and nationalistic views. He has been described by various media of being a political propagandist and was an early adopter of China's "wolf warrior" communication strategy of loudly denouncing criticism of the Chinese government.

== Early life and education ==
Hu was born in Beijing to a poor Christian family.

From 1978 to 1982, Hu attended the People's Liberation Army College of International Relations in Nanjing, Jiangsu for undergraduate studies. After graduating with a master's degree in Russian literature from Beijing Foreign Studies University in 1989, Hu began his career as a journalist at the People's Daily. Hu took part in the 1989 Tiananmen Square protests but later in 2019 called the military action a tragedy caused by student naivety and government inexperience.

== Career ==
Working as a foreign correspondent for the paper, he covered both the Bosnian War and the Iraq War. After covering Yugoslavia's break-up as a war correspondent, he came to admire strong Communist rule.

Hu became editor of the Global Times in 2005, editing both the Chinese-language version and, after its establishment in 2009, the English-language version. Hu described the Global Times as having two bosses, the government and the market. He regards himself as a professional journalist whose mission is to shape public opinion to make China stronger. According to Hu, "In the long run the two are equally important ... if we lose the support of ordinary people and lose our influence, the government won't care about us anymore. Without ordinary people, our paper will die."

According to Richard Burger, a former editor at the Global Times, in the wake of the 2011 arrest of Ai Weiwei, the Chinese staff of the Global Times were ordered by Hu to conduct an "astroturfing" campaign against Ai Weiwei in favor of the Chinese government's criticism of Ai as a "maverick".

Hu's 2013 book On the Complexity of China collects some of his editorials written for the Global Times. Hu structures the book in order to explain his view of Global Times editorial philosophy. Also in the book, Hu writes that liberals also need to crossing the river by touching the stones. He thought liberals are a necessary force to balance conservatives, and any society needs to achieve a balance between freedom and governance. So he hoped that liberals can show more constructive aspects of this balance. As part of his view of a "complicated China," Hu writes that while China's achievements should not be dismissed, its development is still uneven. Hu states that the media should therefore adopt a more balanced perspective that is neither rightist, nor leftist, but pragmatic.

Hu denounced Canada's 2018 arrest of Meng Wanzhou and stated, "I want to tell America that while you cannot beat Huawei in the market, do not use despicable means and play dirty."

Hu had a leading role in framing Chinese public discourse and perceptions on the U.S.-China Trade War. He compared Liu He's trip to Washington D.C. for negotiations to the Hongmen Banquet. When Costco attracted media attention with a store opening in Shanghai that had to be shut down for overcrowding, Hu wrote, "Costco did not leave China as ordered [by U.S. President Donald Trump] but went to Shanghai instead. American companies voted with their feet and proved decoupling is a delusion."

On 9 May 2020, Hu published an opinion piece urging the Chinese government to build more nuclear weapons, including 100 DF-41 intercontinental ballistic missiles.

Amid the 2020–2021 China–India skirmishes, Indian news site ThePrint called Hu Xijin "the Arnab Goswami of China" and said that both of them are also "mirror opposites" because "neither acknowledges the truth on the ground because it doesn't suit their journalism".

Hu stepped down as editor-in-chief of the Global Times in December 2021. His departure, reportedly due to Beijing "strengthening the paper's political guidance", was (according to The Diplomat) connected to efforts of toning down overly confrontational wolf warrior rhetoric, following a deterioration of China's international reputation and CCP general secretary Xi Jinping calling for improvements in the country's international communication at a May 2021 CCP Politburo session. Following his career with the Global Times, Hu remains an active political commentator on Sina Weibo and has occasionally been censored. As of 2024, his Weibo account has 24.82 million followers.

In response to the 2024 pro-Palestinian protests on university campuses, Hu stated that the protests show that "Jewish political and business alliance's control over American public opinion has declined." In November 2025, Hu complained about increasing censorship in China.

"Frisbee Hu" (胡叼盘), a nickname for Hu Xijin, arose from a joke that he retrieves whatever the government throws at him. The Guardian described Hu as "China's troll king".

=== Commentary on 2019–20 Hong Kong protests ===
During the 2019–2020 Hong Kong protests, Hu urged for direct shooting towards the protesters. He also advocated that the police should be waived from any responsibilities even if the protesters were fatally shot. Hu warned that China would bar drafters of the Hong Kong Human Rights and Democracy Act, whose U.S. Senate sponsor is Florida Republican Marco Rubio, from entering mainland China as well as Hong Kong and Macau after U.S. President Trump signed it into law in November 2019. Hu compared the protesters to "ISIS-like terrorists", and accused the U.S. of instigating the protests.

=== Taiwan ===
Hu has supported an increase in hostility with Taiwan. In 2016, the Global Times under Hu's leadership was reprimanded by the government for discussing the potential use of military force to take Taiwan. In 2020 he suggested that Chinese fighter jets should enter into Taiwan's claimed airspace and if shot down, consider it to be a declaration of war. In October 2021, he said, "The people of Taiwan will not follow the DPP and 'fight to the end.'" In December 2021, Hu described Wang Leehom as "American Taiwanese", rather than Chinese, making a distinction between Taiwanese and Chinese.

In July 2022, Hu warned of military retaliation if Nancy Pelosi visited Taiwan, stating "I've conveyed the message: if the U.S. military sends fighter jets to escort Pelosi to Taiwan, then the move would take the vile nature of such a visit to another level, and would constitute aggression. Our fighter jets should deploy all obstructive tactics. If those are still ineffective, I think it is okay too to shoot down Pelosi's plane."

On 12 November 2025, amidst the China–Japan diplomatic crisis, Hu Xijin called Japanese Prime Minister Sanae Takaichi, on X, an evil witch who had ignited a new round of mutual hatred between the Chinese and Japanese people. Hu also said on 17 November that the restoration of an independent Ryukyu state was possible if China helped the Ryukyu people realize their right to self-determination and warned Japan against obstructing China's "sacred right and goal of national reunification". However, he later said on 25 November that state media used "harsh language that does not reflect the actual situation" when criticizing Takaichi and Japan and warned against "exaggerated" and "superficial" information.

== Personal life ==
In October 2020, Apple Daily reported that Hu's son had immigrated to Canada, and that he was mocked for it by fellow news reporters; Hu denied that any of his children live abroad. Additionally, it was reported that Hu made a salary of 570,000 yuan per year at his job at the Global Times, and an additional 12 million yuan per year on digital platforms such as TikTok and Toutiao. Finally, it was also reported that Hu owns a luxury apartment worth 25 million yuan.

In December 2020, South China Morning Post and Apple Daily reported that a former deputy editor at the Global Times submitted a complaint with the CCP's Central Commission for Discipline Inspection, alleging that Hu fathered two children with former colleagues. Hu denied the allegation and labeled it a blackmail attempt.

Party political offices
New title	Communist Party Secretary of Global Times; 2005–2021	Succeeded by Fan Zhengwei
Media offices
New title	Editor-in-chief of Global Times; 2005–2021	Succeeded by Wu Qimin (吴绮敏)
