= Shao Huaze =

Chinese lieutenant general

- 邵华泽

President of the All-China Journalists Association
- In office October 1996 – November 2016
- Preceded by: Wu Lengxi
- Succeeded by: Tian Congming

President of the People's Daily Press
- In office November 1992 – June 2000
- Preceded by: Gao Di
- Succeeded by: Bai Keming

Editor-in-chief of the People's Daily Press
- In office June 1989 – September 1993
- President: Gao Di; Himself
- Preceded by: Tan Wenrui
- Succeeded by: Fan Jingyi

Personal details
- Born: June 1933 (age 93) Chun'an County, Zhejiang, China
- Party: Chinese Communist Party
- Education: Second Military Medical University; Renmin University of China

Military service
- Allegiance: People's Republic of China
- Branch/service: People's Liberation Army Ground Force
- Years of service: 1950–1989
- Rank: Lieutenant general

Chinese name
- Simplified Chinese: 邵华泽
- Traditional Chinese: 邵華澤
Transcriptions
Standard Mandarin
- Hanyu Pinyin: Shào Huázé

Shao Huaze (Chinese: 邵华泽; born June 1933) is a lieutenant general in the People's Liberation Army of China. He served as president of the People's Daily Press from 1992 to 2000 and president of the All-China Journalists Association from 2000 to 2016.

He was a member of the Standing Committee of the 9th and 10th Chinese People's Political Consultative Conference. He was a delegate to the 4th National People's Congress. He was a member of the 14th and 15th Central Committee of the Chinese Communist Party.

== Biography ==
Shao was born in Chun'an County, Zhejiang, in June 1933. He secondary studied at Yanzhou High School (严州中学).

He enlisted in the People's Liberation Army (PLA) in 1950, and joined the Chinese Communist Party (CCP) in 1957. Since 1953, he studied, then taught, at what is now the Second Military Medical University. From 1958 to 1960, he did his postgraduate work at the Renmin University of China. In April 1964, he became an editor of the People's Liberation Army Daily, and was elevated to its deputy president in October 1981. He was head of the Propaganda Division of the People's Liberation Army General Political Department in February 1985, and held that office until June 1989.

He was appointed editor-in-chief of the People's Daily Press in June 1989, concurrently serving as vice president of the All-China Journalists Association since January 1991. He rose to become president of the People's Daily Press in November 1992, and served until June 2000.

He was chosen as president of the All-China Journalists Association in October 1996, a post he kept until November 2016.

He also served as dean of the School of Journalism and Communication, Peking University from May 2002 to October 2013, honorary president of the Photojournalist Society of China, and honorary president of the China Newspaper Association.

He was promoted to the rank of major general (shaojiang) in September 1988 and lieutenant general (zhongjiang) in July 1994.

== Publications ==
- 伏案金台十一年 [Eleven Years in People's Daily] (in Chinese). Beijing: People's Daily Press. 2001. ISBN 9787801530387.
- 邵华泽自选集 [Selected Works of Shao Huaze] (in Chinese). Beijing: Learning Press. 2002. ISBN 9787801163554.
- 邵华泽海外儿童摄影集 [Photographic Album of Overseas Children by Shao Huaze] (in Chinese). Beijing: Writers Publishing House. 2004. ISBN 9787506330473.
- 同研究生谈新闻评论 [Talk About News Commentary with Graduate Students] (in Chinese). Beijing: People's Daily Publishing House. 2010. ISBN 9787511500502.
- 海外印象：邵华泽摄影选 [Overseas Glimpse: Selected Photos by Shao Huaze] (in Chinese). Beijing: China Tourism Press. 2010. ISBN 9787503227431.
- 邵华泽海外风光摄影集 [Photographic Album of Overseas Landscape by Shao Huaze] (in Chinese). Beijing: Chinese Photography. 2010. ISBN 9787802364158.
- 邵华泽书淳安古诗词选 [Selected Ancient Poems of Chun'an] (in Chinese). Beijing: Red Flag Press. 2018. ISBN 9787505143135.
- 马克思主义新闻观及其在当代中国的运用和发展 [Marxist Outlook on Journalism and Its Application and Development in Contemporary China] (in Chinese). Beijing: People's Publishing House. 2009. ISBN 9787010074542.
- 邵华泽书法集 [Calligraphy Collection of Shao Huaze] (in Chinese). Beijing: People's Fine Arts Publishing House. 2010. ISBN 9787102020778.

Party political offices
Preceded by Tan Wenrui	Editor-in-chief of the People's Daily Press; 1989–1993	Succeeded by Fan Jingyi
Preceded by Gao Di	President of the People's Daily Press; 1992–2000	Succeeded by Bai Keming
Media offices
Preceded by Wu Lengxi	President of the All-China Journalists Association; 1996–2016	Succeeded by Tian Congming
