= Global Times =

Chinese daily tabloid

- Type: Daily newspaper (Weekdays with a weekend edition)
- Format: Tabloid
- Owner: People's Daily Press
- Publisher: Global Times Press
- President: Fan Zhengwei
- Editor: Wu Qimin
- Founded: 1993 (Chinese edition); 2009 (English edition)
- Political alignment: Chinese Communist Party
- Language: Chinese and English
- Headquarters: No. 2 Jintai Xilu; Chaoyang District; Beijing, China, 100733
- ISSN: 2095-2678
- OCLC number: 144515996
- Website: www.globaltimes.cn (English) huanqiu.com (Simplified Chinese)

Chinese name
- Simplified Chinese: 环球时报
- Traditional Chinese: 環球時報
Transcriptions
Standard Mandarin
- Hanyu Pinyin: Huánqiú Shíbào

The Global Times is a state-owned media outlet under the auspices of the Chinese Communist Party's flagship newspaper, the People's Daily, commenting on international issues from a nationalistic perspective.

Established as a publication in 1993, its English version was launched in 2009. The editor-in-chief of Global Times was Hu Xijin until December 2021, who has been described as an early adopter of the "wolf warrior" communication strategy of loudly denouncing perceived criticism of the Chinese government and its policies. The newspaper has been the source of various incidents, including fabrications, cover-ups and disinformation. (Note: See references) It is part of a broader set of Chinese state media outlets that constitute the Chinese government's propaganda apparatus.

== History ==
Established as a Chinese-language weekly publication in 1993, an English-language version was launched on 20 April 2009 as part of a Chinese government campaign to compete with overseas media. In 2009, Hu Xijin, the editor-in-chief of both Chinese and English versions at the time, stated that he expected it to make a loss of 20 million yuan in its first year as an English-language publication. In 2016, Hu said the Global Times was profitable but faced difficulties that would be familiar to other newspaper editors.

The Global Times launched its Sina Weibo account in 2010. The Global Times launched its US edition in 2013. In 2016, it was reported that the English-language edition then had approximately 20 "foreign experts" who were involved with assigning stories and copyediting, "as long as the coverage [wa]s not about politics". In April 2017, the Global Times signed a personnel exchange deal with Sputnik, a Russian state media outlet.

In 2019, the Global Times won a three-year contract with the Ministry of Foreign Affairs to monitor overseas social media and provide regular briefings and "comprehensive response plans." In 2020, the Global Times had total revenue of 176 million RMB and net profit of 24.5 million RMB. In December 2021, Hu Xijin announced that he would be stepping down as editor-in-chief. As of at least 2024, the Global Times has a daily circulation of over 2 million copies. It has consistently been regarded as one of China's top media brands. It employs approximately 500 journalists in more than 150 countries.

== Content ==
The Global Times has several sub-brands, including the Chinese version and English version of the Global Times, Global Times Online, the Global Public Opinion Research Center, Life Times, and Satire and Humor. The Global Times is owned by the People's Daily Press, which also publishes People's Daily. The Global Times Online is run by the People's Daily Online; ownership of the newspaper is split 60–40, respectively, between the People's Daily Online and the Global Times Press. Global Times has a public opinion research subsidiary, the Global Times Research Center.

=== Editorial stance ===
The Chinese-language version has been known to have a pro-Chinese Communist Party (CCP) slant, attracting a nationalistic readership since its inception in 1993. It has also been described as Chinese nationalist, conservative and ultranationalist. Launched in 2009, the English-language version initially took a notably less nationalistic stance than its Chinese-language counterpart, featuring interviews with Chinese dissidents, activists, and LGBT-friendly content. It later aligned more closely with the Chinese version. The publication is sometimes called "China's Fox News" for its propaganda and the monetization of nationalism.

Sources both in mainland China and abroad have said that the Global Times is not generally representative of the Chinese government's political positions, while the People's Daily is considered more representative. Others have stated that the Global Times' editorial stance has been viewed as channeling the views of the hardline faction of top leadership. Some scholars have noted that Global Times' more nationalistic stance permits other official state-run media to appear more moderate in tone. According to its former editor Hu Xijin, the Global Times publishes what CCP officials think privately but do not say publicly. According to Asia Society, the Global Times is "not considered an authoritative source of insight into the views of the central leadership".

Hu Xijin has been described as an early adopter of the "wolf warrior" communication strategy of aggressively hitting back at criticism of the Chinese government. His departure in December 2021, reportedly due to Beijing "strengthening the paper's political guidance", was (according to The Diplomat) connected to efforts of toning down overly confrontational rhetoric, following a deterioration of China's international reputation and CCP general secretary Xi Jinping calling for improvements in the country's international communication at a May 2021 CCP Political Bureau session.

Journalist Joshua Kurlantzick wrote in 2022 that the Global Times "has taken approaches like the provocative, argumentative, and conspiracy-minded Russian outlets, mixing nationalism with efforts to mock the United States and other countries". He added, "Outside China, Global Times has used its uber-hawkish editorials and its top editor's skill at sparking controversies to make it relevant on social media internationally, in part because its content elicits responses from foreign officials and opinion leaders."

== Incidents ==
=== U.S.-China trade war ===
In the early stages of the U.S.-China trade war, the Global Times' coverage of the disagreements between the two countries focused narrowly on trade issues. Following the December 2018 arrest of Meng Wanzhou in Canada, Global Times increasingly discussed the trade war as part of a possibly developing new Cold War between the U.S. and China.

=== COVID-19 disinformation ===
The Global Times has spread unfounded conspiracy theories and disinformation related to the COVID-19 pandemic. (Note: See references It has distributed disinformation related to the COVID-19 pandemic via Facebook posts and targeted ads.) In January 2021, the Global Times urged Australia not to use the Pfizer–BioNTech COVID-19 vaccine. In March 2022, the Global Times republished an article by the British conspiracist website The Exposé which falsely claimed COVID-19 was created by Moderna.

=== Astroturfing allegations ===
Richard Burger, a former editor at Global Times, alleges that in the wake of the 2011 arrest of Ai Weiwei, the Chinese staff of the Global Times were ordered by the Chinese Communist Party to conduct an "astroturfing" campaign against "maverick" Ai Weiwei.

=== Fabricated quotes ===
In October 2015, Roderick MacFarquhar, a China expert at Harvard University, spoke at a conference on Marxism in Beijing. He said that Chinese leader Xi Jinping's talk of the Chinese Dream was "not the intellectually coherent, robust and wide-ranging philosophy needed to stand up to Western ideas". The Global Times reported his speech as saying that the "Chinese Dream" would "make great contributions and exert a positive impact on human development". MacFarquhar said that the paraphrasing was a "total fabrication". The line was later removed by the newspaper from its story.

=== Australia ===
In 2016, the Global Times referred to Australia as a "paper cat" in relation to the South China Sea, and a former "offshore prison" in relation to an Olympic champion Mack Horton calling out rival Sun Yang as a drug cheat (in reference to the country's former status as a British penal colony).

=== Hong Kong ===
In May 2016, the Global Times ran a boycott campaign denigrating Hong Kong pro-democracy singer Denise Ho for allegedly advocating independence for Hong Kong and Tibet. On 5 June, Lancôme cancelled a promotional concert by the Cantopop star that was scheduled to be held on 19 June in Sheung Wan. Lancôme also added, in a Facebook post, that Ho was not a spokesperson for the brand. The Tibet allegation appeared to have stemmed from Ho's May 2016 meeting with the Dalai Lama. The cancellation drew a heavy backlash in Hong Kong. Some Lancôme shops in Hong Kong were shut down during the protests. Listerine, another brand that Ho represents, retained the singer despite the fact that the Global Times also criticized that company hiring Ho as its public face in Hong Kong.

In August 2019, Global Times editor Hu Xijin accused the United States of instigating the Hong Kong pro-democracy protests. On 13 August, protestors tied up and beat Global Times journalist Fu Guohao while Fu was attempting to conduct interviews at the Hong Kong Airport. A common mainland perspective is that protestors' attack on Fu marked a peak in the violence of the protests.

=== Taiwan ===
During China's Justice Mission 2025 military exercises around Taiwan, the Global Times falsely stated that the China Coast Guard had quarantined the ports of Keelung, Tainan, Kaohsiung, and Hualien.

=== Xinjiang ===
In 2018, the English edition of the Global Times acknowledged "counter-terrorism education" in Xinjiang, even as Chinese spokespeople denied the existence of the Xinjiang re-education camps. The Economist noted: "Strikingly, rather than claiming that Western journalists misreport Xinjiang, the Global Times prefers to troll them, accusing foreign correspondents of hoping to 'profit' from negative China coverage, while asserting that the Western press is 'nowhere near as influential as it once was' and gleefully noting Mr Trump's attacks on 'fake news'."

In 2019, the Global Times was criticized for perceived bias in its portrayal of Uyghurs and of disinformation campaigns regarding the Xinjiang re-education camps, which led Twitter to ban it and other state-sponsored media outlets from ad purchases. In 2021, ProPublica and The New York Times reported that Global Times was part of a coordinated state campaign to deny human rights abuses in Xinjiang.

=== "Final solution" tweet ===
In October 2021, a tweet from the Global Times which called for a "Final Solution to the Taiwan Question" was condemned by German politician Frank Müller-Rosentritt of the Free Democratic Party for its similarity to the "Final Solution to the Jewish Question" which resulted in the Holocaust.

=== Russian invasion of Ukraine ===
In March 2022, during the Russian invasion of Ukraine, the Global Times promoted unsubstantiated Russian claims of biological weapons labs in Ukraine. The Global Times also echoed Russian state media claims that the Bucha massacre was staged. In May 2022, the Global Times said that a Canadian sniper who volunteered to fight in defense of Ukraine had "accused the Ukrainian army of inadequate weaponry, poor training, heavy losses, profiteering and desertion", citing a report by Russian state media outlet RT. The fact-checking website Polygraph.info found that RT and the Global Times had cherry-picked a report published by the Canadian newspaper La Presse to make the claim.

==== Fake news about protest in Belgium ====
On 23 June 2022, the Global Times claimed that thousands of protesters marched in Brussels condemning NATO's aid for Ukraine during the Russian invasion of Ukraine on 20 June; however, the protest was aimed at inflation as well as high costs of living; no evidence was found that it was linked to NATO. The Belgian Ministry of Foreign Affairs condemned the claim as disinformation.

==== Wagner Group rebellion ====
In June 2023, the Global Times accused Western media of "hyping" the Wagner Group rebellion and did not report on Yevgeny Prigozhin's claims that Russians were deceived into believing NATO was responsible for the invasion.

=== Crocus City Hall attack ===
In March 2024, the Global Times repeated false Russian claims that the United States was behind the Crocus City Hall attack.

== Reception ==
=== In China ===
In May 2016, the Global Times was criticized domestically by the Cyberspace Administration of China for "fabricating" news on the US, the South China Sea, North Korea, and Hong Kong, and "disturbing" the order of the cyberspace. In September 2018, The Economist wrote that it was "not fashionable in China to take the Global Times seriously", with a retired Chinese ambassador in 2016 comparing it to an angry toddler, along with Chinese intellectuals who deplored "its sabre-rattling towards Taiwan and Japan, and its deep reservoirs of grievance".

=== In India ===
In September 2020, India's Ministry of External Affairs issued a statement saying that comments made by the Global Times were falsely attributed to Ajit Doval. In May 2025, following the 2025 India–Pakistan conflict, the Twitter account of Global Times, along with that of Xinhua News Agency, were blocked in India after both continuously published Pakistani claims of Indian military losses during the conflict. Prior to its Twitter account being blocked in India, the Twitter account of the Embassy of India, Beijing rejected Global Times reports, stating "when media outlets share such information without verifying sources, it reflects a serious lapse in responsibility and journalistic ethics." The block on Global Times' account was lifted later on the same day it was imposed.

=== In Singapore ===
In September 2016, the Global Times published an article, titled "Singapore's Delusional Reference to the South China Sea Arbitration During the Non-Aligned Movement Summit". Stanley Loh Ka Leung, then Singapore's ambassador to China, criticized the article as fake news. Loh also asked the Global Times to publish in full, in both English and Chinese, a letter he wrote to the newspaper's then editor-in-chief, Hu Xijin containing evidence which debunked the Global Times' assertions. Loh pointed out that Global Times did not attend the meeting and China was not a member of NAM. Hu refuted the ambassador by saying that the Global Times' reports were reliable and based on information from people who attended the meeting, without publishing the letter that Loh had requested to be published. Loh's letter was widely carried by reputable international newspapers like the Straits Times and South China Morning Post, forcing Global Times to eventually publish Loh's letter online. This was the first time that Global Times published a clarification by a foreign Ambassador.

=== In the United States ===
In June 2020, the United States Department of State designated Global Times as a foreign mission. In February 2023, the US-China Business Council (USCBC) released a statement refuting a Global Times article that claimed USCBC representatives had criticized the US Ambassador to China, Nicholas Burns. The USCBC said that the claims in the report were false and expressed appreciation for Burns' work in Beijing.

== See also ==
- List of newspapers in China
- Mass media in China
