= Li Baoshan =

Chinese politician

- 李宝善

Deputy Director of the Education, Science, Health and Sports Committee of the Chinese People's Political Consultative Conference
- Incumbent
- Assumed office 11 November 2020
- Director: Yuan Guiren

President of People's Daily
- In office April 2018 – November 2020
- Preceded by: Yang Zhenwu
- Succeeded by: Tuo Zhen

Editor-in-Chief of People's Daily
- In office April 2014 – April 2018
- Preceded by: Yang Zhenwu
- Succeeded by: Tuo Zhen

President of Qiushi
- In office June 2008 – April 2014
- Preceded by: Wu Hengquan
- Succeeded by: Li Jie

Chief Editor of Qiushi
- In office December 2003 – June 2008
- Preceded by: Wang Tianxi
- Succeeded by: Zhang Xiaolin

Personal details
- Born: 13 August 1955 (age 71) Jincheng, Shanxi, China
- Party: Chinese Communist Party
- Education: Shanxi Normal University

Chinese name
- Traditional Chinese: 李寶善
- Simplified Chinese: 李宝善
Transcriptions
Standard Mandarin
- Hanyu Pinyin: Lǐ Bǎoshàn

Li Baoshan (born 13 August 1955) is a Chinese politician. He joined Chinese Communist Party in September 1978, and graduated from Shanxi Normal University. He was an alternate member of the 18th Central Committee of the Chinese Communist Party and the member of the 19th Central Commission for Discipline Inspection.

== History ==
Li was born in Jincheng, Shanxi, in August 1955. Li Baoshan is the former CCP Shanxi Provincial Committee Deputy Minister of Publicity Department and Director of the Provincial Government Information Office. He worked in CCP Central Publicity Department in 1995 and served successively as deputy director of the Information Bureau, Director of the Arts and Culture Bureau, Director of the Information Bureau, and Deputy Secretary-General. In December 2003, he served as editor-in-chief of "Qiushi" magazine. In June 2008, he served as the president of Qiushi magazine. In April 2014, he served as People's Daily editor-in-chief. In April 2018, he served as President of People's Daily.

In 2008, he was elected as a member of the 11th CPPCC National Committee, represent of the press and publishing industry, in the 44th group. And served as a special committee of the Population, Resources and Environment Committee.

On November 11, 2020, he was appointed deputy director of the Education, Science, Health and Sports Committee of the Chinese People's Political Consultative Conference.

Party political offices
Previous: Yang Zhenwu	President of People's Daily; April 2018-November 2020	Next: Tuo Zhen
Preceded by Yang Zhenwu	Editor-in-Chief of People's Daily; April 2014-April 2018	Succeeded by Tuo Zhen
Preceded by Wu Hengquan	President of Qiushi; June 2008-April 2014	Succeeded by Li Jie
Preceded by Wang Tianxi	Chief Editor of Qiushi; December 2003-June 2008	Succeeded by Zhang Xiaolin
