= 2013 Southern Weekly incident =

Press censorship incident

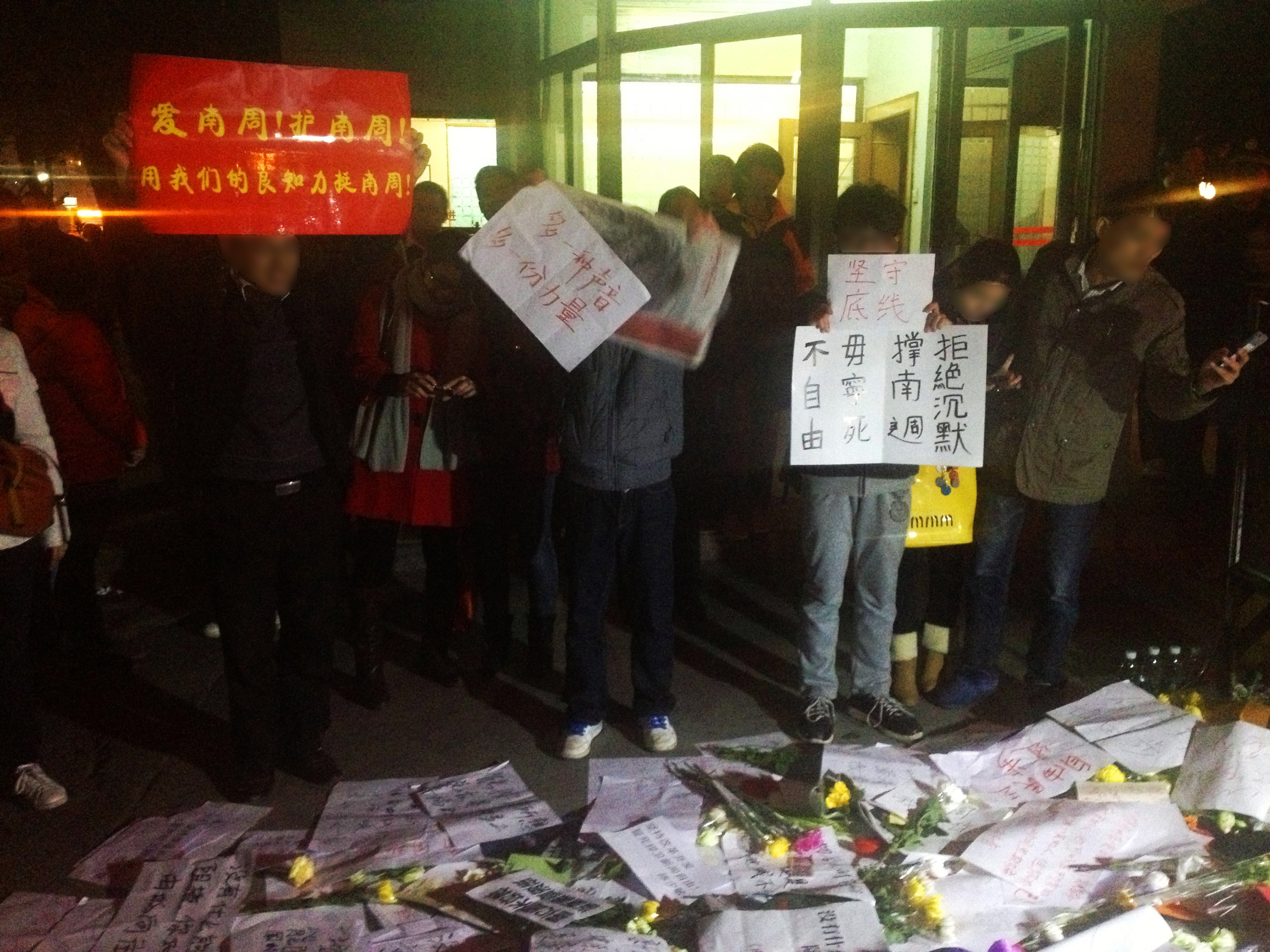
Protesters in front of the headquarters of Southern Newspaper Media Group on the evening of January 7

The 2013 Southern Weekly incident was a conflict which arose over government censorship of a "New Year's Greeting" published in the Chinese newspaper Southern Weekly. Guangdong Province's Propaganda Department bypassed standard censorship protocols by changing the headline and content of the New Year's message without first informing Southern Weekly editors. In protest, newsroom staff posted online criticisms of the state of free expression in China and went on a four-day strike. The incident also sparked public demonstrations against press censorship which took place outside Southern Weekly's headquarters in Guangzhou, China. As a result of the incident and the accompanying demonstrations, keywords such as "Southern Weekly," "January 7 protest," and "open letter" have become sensitive topics blocked by the Chinese firewall.

== Southern Weekly background ==
The Southern Weekly is a liberal-leaning paper founded in 1984 in Guangdong, Guangzhou. It is a part of the Nanfang Media Group (Chinese: 南方报业传媒集团), which is a provincial government-owned media corporation. Despite its ties to the Chinese Communist Party, Southern Weekly is known for hard-hitting journalism which tests the limits of free speech in China. The paper gained worldwide recognition in 2009, when U.S. President Barack Obama selected it, as opposed to the state television service, to interview him during his visit to China in that year. Southern Weekly's highest ranking editor, Xiang Xi, was demoted following the interview. Political theorists suggested that his demotion was punishment by the Party's propaganda department, angered because Southern Weekly did not seek its permission before agreeing to conduct the interview.

== Sequence of events ==
All the following events are timed using UTC +08:00.

On January 3, 2013, Southern Weekly editors awoke to find that the New Year's Greeting they had penned two days earlier had been radically revised by government censors. The original version of the Greeting, written by staff reporter Dai Zhiyong (戴志勇), was titled Dream of China, Dream of Constitutionalism (中国梦，宪政梦). It called for the revitalization of human rights in China and the curtailment of excessive use of government power. The published version was titled "We Are Now Closer to Our Dream Than Ever Before" (我们比任何时候都更接近梦想) and was accompanied by an introductory message written by the highest-ranking member of the Guangdong Propaganda Office, Tuo Zhen. The introductory message, titled "Pursuing Our Dreams" (追梦), praised the Chinese Communist Party and quoted directly from the New Year's message published in the Party-run newspaper Official Peoples Daily.

=== Preparation ===
In early December, Southern Weekly's editorial board decided upon "travelling across the river" (过河) as the topic of the New Year's message. However, chief editor Huang Can (黄灿), did not like the idea. In mid-December, Huang suggested that "Chinese Dream" (中国梦) be adopted as the keyword for the message. On the night of December 23, the editorial board finalized the following preliminary plan for New Year's edition:

1. New Year's Message: Analyze the question "At what stage is the Chinese Dream; What kind of Chinese Dream should China have now." Later this formed the first draft of Chinese Dream, Constitutional Dream (中国梦 宪政梦).
2. Past Chinese Dreams: Reflect on the past century and consider how the Chinese Dream evolved throughout it.
3. Dreams and Reality: A list of notable figures from the past year who embody the Chinese Dream and contributed to its advancement.
4. Journalist Actions: Chronicle the daily lives of select journalists and report on their personal and professional dreams.
5. Ten Predictions for the Coming New Year: Invite public figures to predict the ways in which Chinese society will develop during 2013.
6. Collection of the Past "Chinese Dream Practitioners": A list of notable historical figures who have advanced the Chinese Dream.
7. Evaluation of 2012 Newsmakers: A review of the most important news stories of 2012.

On the afternoon of December 24, Huang Can asked the editorial board to submit the plan to the Propaganda Department of Guangdong Provincial Party Committee. Two days later, on December 26, Huang briefed the editorial board on the Propaganda Department's notes for revision:

1. The Department stated that in the "Past Chinese Dreams" section, articles should not mention Mao Zedong or others related to him. The Department also slated some descriptions of historical figures involved in the legal system for revision or omission.

2. Three figures needed to be removed from the articles in the "Dream and Reality" section of the edition. The first was Ren Jianyu (任建宇), a recent college-graduate official who was sent to labor camp. One of his crimes was owning a T-shirt with "Give me Liberty or Give me Death" printed on it. The second was the group of sensible patriots at Anti-Japanese demonstration. The third was Qian Liqun (钱理群), a non-partisan author and researcher of modern Chinese literature. The Propaganda Department also expressed reluctance about adding Zhang Xiaolong (张小龙), manager of Tencent's WeChat, to the list.

3. In the "Ten Predictions for the Coming New Year" section, the Department called for four predictions to be removed: Whether a Second-child policy will replace the One-child policy in the whole country; Whether other provinces will try to publicize lists of government officials' properties and possessions; Whether the Re-education through labor policy will be repealed; Whether more counties will provide visa-free policy to Chinese passport holders.

4. The Department prohibited editors from including Bai Yansong or Liu Ji (刘吉), a member of the CPPCC National Committee that publicly criticized the corruption within the Party, in the "Collection of the Past 'Chinese Dream Practitioners'" section.

Next, Southern Weekly's graphic design team began planning the graphics which would accompany the paper's New Year's edition. They decided upon a traditional ink wash painting of Yu the Great stopping the flood as the headline picture.

On December 29, Southern Weekly commentator Dai Zhiyong (戴志勇) completed a draft of the New Year's Greeting, which he titled Chinese Dream, Constitutional Dream, and submitted it to chief editor Huang. The next afternoon, Huang expressed dissatisfaction with the greeting, saying: "(I) don't know how to revise the message after the first paragraph. I don't even dare to submit this version (to the propaganda department) since the department will cancel the whole New Year special (after reading this)." He suggested that Dai's piece was too heavy-handed in its mentions of constitutionalism.

The head of the editorial department, Shi Zhe (史哲), revised the greeting late at night on December 31. The 1,800 character long message, retitled Chinese Dream, Difficult Dream (中国梦 梦之难), emphasized the national rejuvenation which had occurred over the past 170 years in China and attempted to convey the difficulties associated with pursuing the Chinese Dream. Huang then submitted the revised message to the propaganda department. On the afternoon of December 31, Huang conveyed the propaganda department's comments on the piece to his coworkers, modified it somewhat, and renamed it Dream Make Life Shine (梦想，让生命迸射光芒). Huang's second revision was only 1,400 characters, as its discussion of constitutionalism and human rights had been further abridged. Huang said, "Once this messages gets approved (by the propaganda department), I'll be mostly relieved."

Editorial head Shi Zhe performed some minor modifications and passed the draft on to editors Cao Junwu (曹筠武) and Yang Jibin (杨继斌). Shi told them that the draft had already been approved by the propaganda department and so should not be extensively modified. Cao and Yang made

Cao and Yang sensed that the post-censorship draft was different in written style than other editorials they have been edited, hence they did some changes rhetorically. The final draft, named Dream is our Promise to the Ideal Matter (梦想是我们对应然之事的承诺), was about 1,000 Chinese characters. (However at a meeting on January 5, Huang professed to change the title to We are Closer to the Dream than Any Other Times (我们比任何时候都更接近梦想), before submitting to the propaganda department).

At 9 pm that day (December 31), Huang debriefed his colleagues that the whole "Evaluation of 2012 Newsmakers" section should be removed; In the "Journalist Actions" section, the reports of post-90s teenagers at Shifang protest as well as Zhang Jing (张晶, wife of Xia Junfeng. Xia is a merchant who defended himself against Chengguan and was sentenced to the death penalty). Huang declared that this move was his promise to the propaganda department to make the New Year special to be published. In the end, the "Chinese Dream" New Year special was reduced to 12 pages, rather than the planned 16 pages. During typesetting Huang took a photo of the sample pressing of headline on his phone and sent it to the propaganda department. At or around midnight of January 1, 2013, Huang suddenly received a new opinion from the propaganda department:

1. Headline photo was too gloomy and could be misinterpreted by others. It was asked to be changed to a photo of aircraft carrier. (Presumably, Liaoning (16))
2. Chinese Dream, Difficult Dream should not be used as the New Year special's title.

But the editors (Shi Zhe, Cao Junwu, Yang Jibin, Su Yongtong, and Ye Weimin) at duty told Huang that it was not possible to change the special completely since approval node for the sample has expired. After calling the propaganda department Huang was told that the headline photo can stay but the title must be changed. Eventually the title was changed to Dream of Homeland (家国梦).

=== Modification by Propaganda Department after finalization ===
On January 1, 2013, Southern Weekly finalized the special at 3 am. The five editors went home for the New Year's holidays, ending their three-day overtime shift. The same day, chief editor Huang Can and standing vice chief editor Wu Xiaofeng (伍小峰) were summoned by Guangdong's ministry of propaganda. The deputy minister (also the Nanfang Media Group party chief) and ministry news director were also present. Despite the editors' protests over the extensive censorship already gone through, the following changes were made:

1. Censors edited away tens of and added over a hundred words.
2. After Huang protested removing the headlining ink painting of Yu, the deputy minister shrunk the image and had a preface superimposing the CCP's ideologies added.
3. The article on sensible patriots at anti-Japanese demonstrations was replaced with Southern Weekly branding.
4. The name of the special was further changed from The Homeland Dream (家国梦) to Chasing Dreams (追梦).

As the editors and proofreaders were on holiday, Huang and Wu bypassed normal procedures and modified the pages. After publishing, readers found several spelling, grammatical, and factual issues in the preface, such as claiming the pre-dynastic event of Yu suppressing the Great Flood happened "2000 years ago", which would fall under the age of Wang Mang usurping the Han dynasty throne.

=== Staff's struggle against officials ===
On January 3, some of the Southern Weekly reporters post Sina Weibo to protest Tuo Zhen's ultra vires acts. As a consequence, 15 reporters' Weibo accounts got muted or deleted.Southern Weekly's editorial department released a statement about Tuo's distortion on their articles.

On the morning of January 4, about fifty editors and reporters who previously worked for Southern Weekly co-signed an open letter, criticizing Tuo's instruction of altering the work as "an act of cross-boundary; an act of domineering; an act of ignorance; a move of unnecessariness." (越界之举、擅权之举、愚昧之举、多此一举) They demanded Tuo take the blame and resign, and restore the Weibo account for the affected reporters.

At the night of January 5, Southern Weekly called an emergency enlarged meeting for members of the editorial board. Huang and Wu detailed what happened to the editorial staffs. Shortly after the meeting, the administrator of Southern Weekly's official Weibo account was asked to hand over the password, which immediately made the editorial staffs start to negotiate with the leaders of Nanfang Media Group. Next morning, the heads of Southern Weekly met with Tuo Zhen. Tuo promised that a Great Purge will not happen. Nevertheless at night, Wu Wei (吴蔚), administrator of the official Weibo account was forced to hand in the password, and soon after the official Weibo posted a "clarification", passing the blame to the editors. Meanwhile, Huang Can, chief editor of Southern Weekly took the responsibility of the incident, saying Tuo has nothing with the incident.

On January 7, Southern Weekly News Ethics Committee posted a public statement at several social medias, pointing the finger to chief editor Huang Can and standing vice chief editor Wu Xiaofeng, blaming them acting against normal procedure under pressures from higher authority. The statement made no mention of Tuo Zhen. Some of the Southern Weekly staffs, including Zhang Hua (张华), Zhu Zhaoxin (褚朝新), and Chao Getu (朝格图), went on strike. Hong Kong broadcasting station TVB confirmed that the economy department of Southern Weekly was also on strike.

=== Sina Weibo backfire ===
On 9:18 pm, January 6, Wu Wei (吳蔚), director of Southern Weekly's news department, posted a statement on Sina Weibo, which was censored and removed shortly after:

I have handed in the password of Sina Weibo account @SouthernWeekly to Mao Zhe, General Manager of Southern Weekly's New Media business. I will not be responsible for the following statement and any future content posted by that account. (本人已向協助分管南方周末新媒體業務的總經理毛哲上繳新浪微博賬號@南方周末 的密碼，對此賬號即將發布的聲明以及今後所有內容，本人將不負任何責任。)

Two minutes later (at 9:20 pm), Southern Weekly's official Weibo account sent a "clarification" statement:

To our readers: The New Year Message we published on the January 3 New Year special was written by our editor in accordance to the topic Chasing Dreams; the preface on the front page was written by one of our directors. The rumors on the Internet is untrue. We apologize to you for the mistakes we made due to our negligence under the haste. (致讀者：本報1月3日新年特刊所刊發的新年獻詞，系本報編輯配合專題『追夢』撰寫，特刊封面導言系本報一負責人草擬，網上有關傳言不實。由於時間倉促，工作疏忽，文中存在差錯，我們就此向廣大讀者致歉。)

At 9:23 pm, Southern Weekly Cultural Edition's Weibo account confirmed the information Wu Wei sent:

@FengDuan is the General Manager of Southern Weekly's New Media business. @SouthernWeekly does not belong to Southern Weekly at this moment. (@風端 為南方周末新媒體執行官。@南方周末 官微目前已不屬於南方周末。)

Soon after at 9:30 pm, @SouthernWeeklyEditorialDepartment2013 (@南周編輯部2013) posted:

At the night of January 5, Southern Weekly called an emergency enlarged meeting for members of editorial board. We are planning to constitute an investigation team on the New Year special issue immediately, complete the incident report and submit it to the higher authority. However, at about the same time, the related authority pressured Southern Weekly to release an falsified statement through our official Weibo account, trying to shift the blame on the editors who were not even present. (We) call for factualism; stop all the interruptions before the final report get released. Let the truth write the history. (1月5日晚，南方周末緊急召開編委擴大會議，欲立即啟動新年特刊事件調查組，形成權威事件報告，呈送上級組織，但幾乎在同時，有關當局竟欲施壓南方周末通過官方微博發布替其澄清的不實聲明，欲將新年特刊事件的責任歸咎於當時並不在場的編輯。呼籲尊重事實，在調查報告結論未出之前，排除一切干擾，讓真相還給歷史。)

The very same Weibo post was also reposted by the official account of Southern Weekly's Economy Edition. However except the 9:20 pm Weibo post, all other posts were censored and removed by Sina Weibo.

At 9:49 pm, a Weibo account posted a statement that claimed to be from all editorial staff of Southern Weekly's Economy Edition, stating "Editorial staffs will fight against the inaccurate statement till the every end. We won't continue to work until the incident gets resolved." (採編人員將與此不實聲明抗爭到底，事態解決前不再進行正常採編工作。)

At 11:04 pm, the official Weibo account of Southern Weekly's Economy Edition posted a statement and attached some names of their staff (from editorial board, news department, economy department, green news department, cultural department, commentary department, new media business, visual graphics publishing business and Chengdu station. A total of 97 people):

Southern Weekly's official Sina Weibo account (@SouthernWeekly) was taken over forcibly. The 9:30 pm post [sic 9:20 pm actually] by that account was not the truth. We will update publicly once we have accurate information. January 6, 2012 [sic 2013] 22:27 (南方周末新浪官方微博（@南方周末）賬號已被強行收繳。南方周末官微2013年1月6日21:30已發表的《致讀者》，並非真相。我們將陸續通過公開途徑發布準確信息。 2012年1月6日 22:27)

Those series of Weibo posts intensified the incident. On the night of January 6, media with different opinions, public figures, and anonymous users posted their supports or doubts about the incident, however some of the posts got removed very soon. At 2:30 am of January 7, Fang Kecheng (方可成), a reporter for Southern Weekly, posted a long Weibo signed as Southern Weekly News Ethics Committee on his verified Weibo account, describing what happened at the editorial department between the emergency meeting from 7:00 pm, January 5, to 10:00 pm, January 6.

=== Reprint of Global Times' editorial ===
On the evening of January 7, several media persons pointed out that the Central Propaganda Department issued instructions to some newspapers and network media to reprint an editorial from Global Times titled Southern Weekend's "to our readers" is thought-provoking, which is an article alleging Chen Guangcheng as the supporter of the incident, and saying that the so-call "free media" cannot exist under the socio-political reality of China today. From January 8, one after another, the newspapers reprinted the editorial invariably. But some of the media added the disclaimers at the end of the reprinted article stating the "republishing the editorial does not mean it agrees with their views or confirm the description", such as Tencent stating "republishing this article does not mean Tencent is in favor of their views or confirms the description" at the end of the reprint; Sina also said in a statement that "Sina posted this article for the purpose of passing more information. It does not mean (Sina) agrees with their views or confirms the description".

The following newspapers reprinted Global Times' editorial:

- January 8: Beijing Evening News (Beijing), Beijing Youth Daily (Beijing), Xinkuaibao (Guangzhou), Information Times (Guangzhou), Yangcheng Evening News (Guangzhou), Xinmin Evening News (Shanghai), City News (Hangzhou), Huaxi City News (Chengdu), Jinbao (Shenzhen);
- January 9: Xiaoxiang Morning News (Hunan), The Beijing News (Beijing).

The Beijing News used to be owned by Nanfang Media Group, which also owns Nanfang Weekly, and it was reluctant to reprint the editorial. On the night of January 8, Yan Liqiang (严力强), assistant minister of Beijing Party Committee, swooped on the editorial department of The Beijing News and demanded it to reprint Global Times' editorial: Initially discussion with Dai Zigeng (戴自更), principle of paper, and Wang Yuechun (王跃春), chief editor, was unsuccessful; at the midnight of January 9, all on-duty editors voted nay to reprint, but Yan insist that "(You) must reprint the editorial, otherwise we will dismiss the newspaper." Eventually The Beijing News reprinted the editorial on Page A20 ("Signature of Editor-in-Duty" was left blank). Dai Zigeng asked to resign after failing not to reprint. According to Radio Hong Kong, Dai's resignation was not approved.

Xiaoxiang Morning News did not reprint the editorial on January 8, hence was criticized by the Central Propaganda Department. It reprinted the editorial with How to Trust the Feeling to Correction (今天我们如何弥合信任拨正情绪), Follow the Time (要跟得上时代的节拍), and an advertisement for deinsectization service on the same page, and this was understood to be an insinuation to the Global Time. Gong Xiaoyue (龚晓跃), former head of Xiaoxiang Morning News, who got demoted in 2010 because of a special cover, voiced against editorial by Global Times. He got muted on Sina Weibo soon after. His personal Weibo account, as well as some Nanfang Weekly journalists', got un-muted at the midnight of January 12.

On January 9, "Porridge from the South" (南方的粥), an article from The Beijing News Gourmet Weekly, got promoted to the front page of The Beijing News online. The title was considered to be a paronomasia since "粥" (Porridge) and "周" (Week) are both pronounced as "zhōu", so the title can also be understood as being "Week(ly) from the South". The idea was reinforced by the first sentence of the article, "Rice was boiling in pot of hot porridge from the South when just served; it seems, also, to have a brave heart. In this cold night, breath is frozen, and in this tiring world, only this porridge and its warmth should not be let down." (一碗熱滾滾的砂鍋粥，來自南方大地，剛端上桌時，粥還在裡面翻滾，它似乎也有一顆勇敢的心，在寒冷的夜裡，張嘴都是白氣，塵世折騰，惟有溫暖與這碗粥不可辜負).

== Official responses ==
On January 4, when asked about the incident, Hua Chunying, the spokeswoman for the Ministry of Foreign Affairs of the People's Republic of China said: "I do not know about the specific circumstances, which do not belong to the Ministry of Foreign Affairs. I would like to point out a matter of principle that the so-called censorship does not exist in China. The Chinese government protects the press freedom in accordance with the laws, and gives full play to the supervisory role of the news media and citizens."

Other official media, such as the People's Daily, Xinhua News Agency have not expressed their stances. The Propaganda Department of Guangdong Provincial Party Committee has not come out to provide any explanation either.

== Reactions ==
=== International ===
Wang Yu-chi, the Minister of the Mainland Affairs Council of the Republic of China called on Beijing to improve the news environment, and respect the press freedom. On January 8, Taiwan's opposition party Democratic Progressive Party also expressed its views on the incident. Su Tseng-chang, the party chairman said: "A media environment with freedom of speech can help the real reform of the Chinese Communist." Former party chairman Tsai Ing-wen also expressed that press freedom is a universal value can not be deprived of.

On January 7, Victoria Nuland, Spokesperson for the United States Department of State spoke to reporters at the daily department briefing that "We believe that censorship of the media is incompatible with China’s aspirations to build a modern information-based economy and society. It is, of course, interesting that we now have Chinese who are strongly taking up their right for free speech, and we hope the government’s taking notice."

== See also ==
- Digital divide in China
- Media of China
- Southern Weekly
- Web and media controversies over the 2008 Summer Olympics
- Yanhuang Chunqiu
