= People's Daily Online =

Chinese news company owned by People's Daily

- Native name: 人民网
- Website type: State media
- Available in: Mandarin Chinese (Simplified, Traditional), English, Japanese, French, Spanish, Russian, Arabic, Korean, Mongolian, Tibetan, Uyghur, Kazakh, Korean, Yi, Zhuang, German
- Traded as: SSE: 603000
- Founded: January 1, 1997; 29 years ago
- Owner: People's Daily
- Chairperson: Ye Zhenzhen
- Website: www.people.com.cn; www.people.cn
- Advertising: Yes
- Registration: Optional
- Current status: Active

People's Daily Online
- Simplified Chinese: 人民网
- Traditional Chinese: 人民網
Transcriptions
Standard Mandarin
- Hanyu Pinyin: Rénmín Wǎng

People.cn Co., Ltd.
- Simplified Chinese: 人民网股份有限公司
- Traditional Chinese: 人民網股份有限公司
Transcriptions
Standard Mandarin
- Hanyu Pinyin: Rénmín Wǎng Gǔfèn Yǒuxiàn Gōngsī

People's Daily Online is a state media company controlled by the People's Daily Press, the publisher of the People's Daily, the official newspaper of the Central Committee of the Chinese Communist Party. Formerly the online version of the People's Daily, it was officially launched on January 1, 1997. The company is listed on the Shanghai Stock Exchange.

People's Daily Online has 17 versions in 16 languages, including Chinese (simplified and traditional), English, Japanese, French, German, Spanish, Russian, Arabic, Korean (for overseas), Mongolian, Tibetan, Uyghur, Kazakh, Korean (for Chinese Koreans), Yi, and Zhuang. It has 31 branches in mainland China and overseas branches in South Korea, Japan, Russia, the United Kingdom, South Africa and the United States. On March 19, 2013, People's Daily Online opened a branch in Hong Kong.

== History ==
People's Daily Online was officially launched on January 1, 1997.

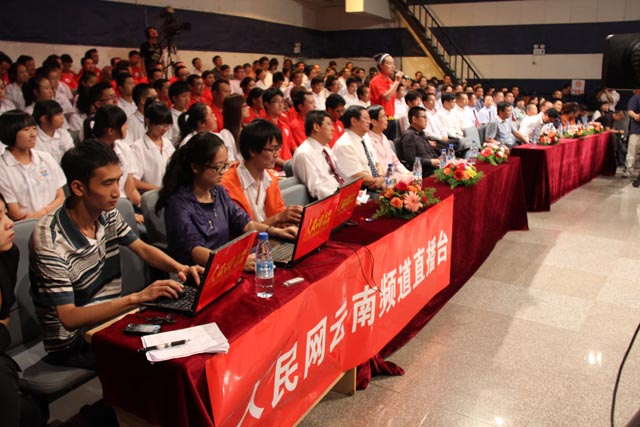
The live broadcast station of an event on People's Daily Yunnan Channel in 2011

On March 19, 2013, People's Daily Online opened a branch in Hong Kong. President Liao Yan said at the inaugural meeting that the purpose of entering Hong Kong was to "work hard to build a communication platform between the government and the people and promote social harmony." In March 2013, the Voice of Russia and the People's Daily Online signed a news sharing agreement as CCP General Secretary Xi Jinping and Russian President Vladimir Putin presided. On 13 October 2014, Russia Today and the People's Daily Online signed a cooperation agreement. In 2015, People's Daily Online launched the entrepreneurial video program "Maker Lecture Hall."

== Content ==
People's Daily Online publishes a digitized and downloadable version of the People's Daily print edition. It also runs the Chinese Communist Party News Network and offers the Leadership Message Board. It also runs Global Times Online, the online edition of the Global Times; ownership of the newspaper is split 60–40, respectively, between the People's Daily Online and the Global Times Press. The ownership of Haiwainet is also divided between People's Daily Online and the People's Daily Press.

=== Qiangguo Forum ===
The Qiangguo Forum (lit. "Strong country forum") is an online forum of People's Daily Online. It is also the first political forum launched by an official Chinese website. It has a high social influence and is also the most well-known interactive column in China's Internet news media. The predecessor of the Qiangguo Forum was the "Strong Protest against NATO's Atrocities BBS Forum", which was established on May 9, 1999, the day after the United States bombing of the Chinese embassy in Belgrade. The Qiangguo Forum gradually became a gathering place for Chinese nationalists and a source of material for scholars studying Chinese public opinion and Chinese nationalism.

The Qiangguo Forum is also one of the interactive platforms for Chinese leaders to communicate with netizens online. On June 20, 2008, CCP General Secretary Hu Jintao went to the Qiangguo Forum and had an online exchange with netizens. Prior to this, Li Zhaoxing, then Minister of Foreign Affairs, and others had also interacted with netizens at the Qiangguo Forum.

=== Leader's Message Board ===
The Leader's Message Board is an online message platform under the People's Daily Online. After users register an account, they can leave messages to leaders of the State Council ministries and local leaders (usually local administrative heads and party committee secretaries). The messages are reviewed and then publicly displayed. The leading departments will reply to the messages through their official accounts, and users can comment on the messages. Users who leave messages are divided into natural person users and corporate legal person users, and the accounts that reply to messages may be ministries and commissions of the State Council, local administrative departments, state-owned enterprises or other agencies. According to China Media Project, the platform "claims to allow citizens to directly pose questions to officials or express their views, but in fact is little more than an officially curated comment service".

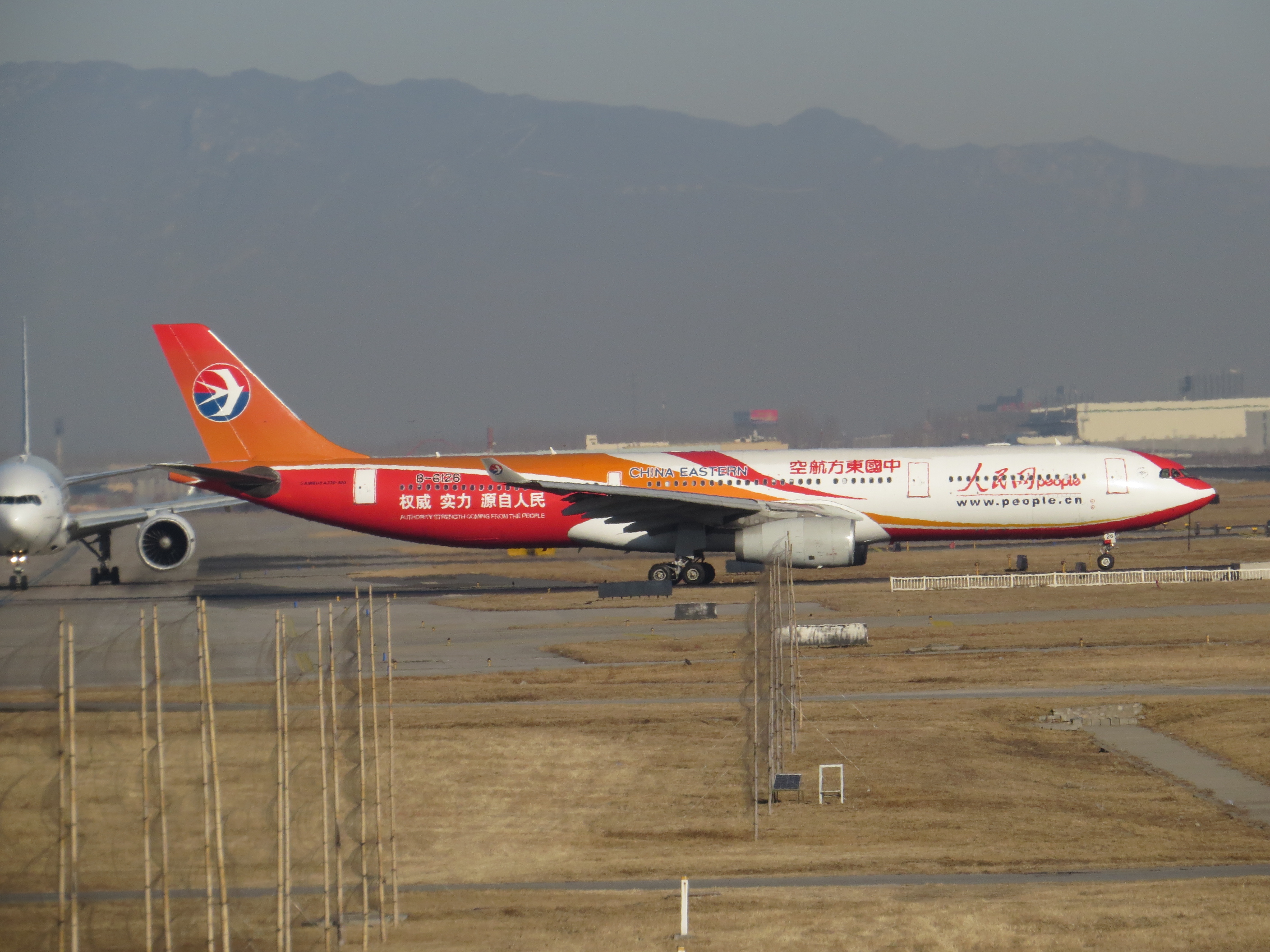
China Eastern Airlines Airbus A330-300 aircraft with People's Daily Online advertisement painted on it

== Ownership and corporate affairs ==
People's Daily Online was listed on April 27, 2012, on the Shanghai Stock Exchange, becoming the first news website to enter the A-share market and the first central media to achieve a full listing.

As of 2025, the People's Daily Press has a controlling 56.55 percent stake in People's Daily Online. Other major investors include CITIC Securities, China Mobile and the Hong Kong Securities Company. Annual net income for People's Daily Online from 2017 to 2023 is:

Year	Net income (RMB¥ m)	Sources
2017	69.99	
2018	195.08	
2019	274.96	
2020	308.45	
2021	130.52	
2022	156.69	
2023	273.29	
