= Two Newspapers and One Journal =

Cultural Revolution-era term

Two Newspapers and One Journal (Chinese: 两报一刊; pinyin: Liǎng bào yī kān) was a term used during the Cultural Revolution to refer to People's Daily, People's Liberation Army Daily and Red Flag, the three most influential media during that period.

== History ==
On 31 May 1966, three days after the formation of the Cultural Revolution Group, the group moved to take control of People's Daily, People's Liberation Army Daily and Red Flag. The publications immediately went through changes to reflect the views of Mao Zedong and others in the top leadership. The takeover was exercised by Chen Boda, who first moved to take control of the People's Daily. On 1 June, the People's Daily printed an editorial called Sweep Away All Cow Demons and Snake Spirits, seeking support for the Cultural Revolution and the moving against "rightist". Chen and his team later gained control over the People's Liberation Army Daily and Red Flag. By the end of 1966, after the publication of an article titled Complete the Revolution on the Frontlines of Journalism, a large number of newspapers in China had shut down.

Many of the official commentaries in these papers were written by a "Proletarian Command", referring to Mao and his trusted supporters. The most important publications were labeled in each publication as being jointly released by all three. The three publications were considered the most important guides for Chinese Communist Party behavior and the unification of public opinion. They also promoted the Mao Zedong's cult of personality. After Mao's death in September 1976, the three publications published Mao's "dying words" which was "Stay the course". After the Gang of Four was overthrown in October 1976, Hua Guofeng and his team published an article titled "A Great and Historic Victory" in the three newspapers.
