= Tuo Zhen =

Chinese journalist and politician

- 庹震

President of the People's Daily Press
- In office 16 October 2020 – 27 September 2024
- Preceded by: Li Baoshan
- Succeeded by: Yu Shaoliang

Editor-in-chief of the People's Daily Press
- In office 3 April 2018 – 26 February 2022
- President: Li Baoshan→Himself
- Preceded by: Li Baoshan
- Succeeded by: Yu Shaoliang

Deputy Head of the Publicity Department of the Chinese Communist Party
- In office July 2015 – March 2018
- Head: Liu Qibao→Huang Kunming

Head of the Propaganda Department of Guangdong
- In office May 2012 – July 2015
- Party Secretary: Wang Yang → Hu Chunhua
- Preceded by: Lin Xiong
- Succeeded by: Shen Haixiong

Personal details
- Born: 9 September 1959 (age 67) Nanyang, Henan, China
- Party: Chinese Communist Party
- Education: Wuhan University

Tuo Zhen (Chinese: 庹震; pinyin: Tuǒ Zhèn; born 9 September 1959) is a Chinese journalist and politician, serving the Chief Editor and President of the People's Daily Press, the official mouthpiece of the Central Committee of the Chinese Communist Party since April 2018. From July 2015 to March 2018 he was the deputy head of the Central Propaganda Department of the Chinese Communist Party (CCP). Tuo is the former provincial propaganda chief of Guangdong, during which he was widely known for his involvement in the 2013 Southern Weekly incident. He has also served as the vice-president of the state-run Xinhua News Agency.

== Biography ==
Tuo Zhen was born in Fangcheng County, Henan province, in 1959. His family name is extremely rare. In 1978, Tuo Zhen was admitted to Wuhan University, majoring in political economics. After graduating from university in 1982, he was assigned to work as an editor for the Economic Daily. In 2005, he was promoted to chief editor. In 2011, he was transferred to become vice president of Xinhua News Agency. In May 2012, Tuo Zhen was transferred to Guangdong province, named a member of the provincial Party Standing Committee, and head of the Guangdong Propaganda Department.

In January 2013, it is reported that under the command of Tuo Zhen, Guangdong liberal newspaper Southern Weekly was forced to add a provided commentary glorifying the CCP with its annual new year editorial, which was originally intended to call for proper implementation of the country's constitution. This action provoked many Southern Weekly reporters and intellectuals (include Mao Yushi, Zhang Yihe, Li Chengpeng, Zhang Sizhi, He Weifang, Leung Man-tao, Cai Ziqiang, Jiang Mingxiu, etc.) to criticize Tuo and call for his position. Over the period of a few weeks, nearly a dozen drafts were circulated between editors and propaganda officials under Tuo; ultimately the final article had evolved to look nothing like the original draft.

In July 2015, Tuo Zhen was promoted to deputy head of the CCP Central Propaganda Department, serving as an assistant to Liu Qibao.

In April 2018, Tuo was appointed as the editor-in-chief of the People's Daily Press, which publishes People's Daily, the official newspaper of the CCP Central Committee. In November 2020, he was appointed President of the People's Daily Press, replacing Li Baoshan.

== See also ==
- 2013 Southern Weekly incident

== Works ==
- Eyes Under the Blue Sky: Visions of a Journalist. The Economic Daily Press. 1989. ISBN 7800361551.
- Silent Horizon. Communication University of China. 1991.
- Early Spring Sun. China Industry & Commerce Associated Press. 1993. ISBN 7801000226.
- Seeking Clues in Newspapers. China Industry & Commerce Associated Press. 1994. ISBN 7801000161.
- Watching the Borders. China Development Press. 1995. ISBN 7800872033.
- The Art of News Interviewing and Writing. China Worker's Press. 1996. ISBN 9787500818687.
- How to be an All-weather Journalist. China Development Press. 1998. ISBN 9787800872624.
- The Window Facing Society. China Development Press. 1999. ISBN 9787800873430.

Party political offices
Preceded by Lin Xiong	Head of the Propaganda Department of Guangdong Province; 2012–2015	Succeeded by Shen Haixiong
Preceded by Li Baoshan	Editor-in-chief of the People's Daily Press; 2018–2022	Succeeded by Shen Haixiong
Previous: Yu Shaoliang	President of the People's Daily Press; 2020–2024	Succeeded by Yu Shaoliang
