= Gao Di (politician) =

Chinese politician (1927–2019)

Gao Di (Chinese: 高狄; pinyin: Gāo Dí; November 1927 – 26 October 2019), pen name Wen Di (闻迪), was a Chinese politician and political theorist, best known for his term as the editor-in-chief of People's Daily Press and as Chinese Communist Party Committee Secretary of Jilin province.

== Biography ==
Gao was born in Linyi, Shandong Province. He graduated during the Republican era at Manchukuo University in Changchun, Jilin. He joined the Chinese Communist Party (CCP) following the Second Sino-Japanese War in April 1946. After the founding of the People's Republic in 1949, Gao worked in Jilin province. He worked for the Jilin City CCP committee, then at Songhuajiang Daily, then Yongji prefecture. He was purged during the Cultural Revolution and sent to perform rural labour. In 1972, he returned to work, taking on a leading role in the provincial Office for Rural Affairs and Forestry and various leading posts in Jilin City, eventually being promoted to party chief and mayor of Jilin City. In March 1983, he was admitted to the Jilin provincial party committee; in May 1985 he was named CCP Committee Secretary of Jilin province.

In April 1988 he was transferred to the central party authorities to take on the office of Executive Vice President of the CCP Central Party School. After the 1989 Tiananmen Square protests and massacre, the leadership of People's Daily was reshuffled in order to ensure "political loyalty" of the newspaper, with Gao Di taking on the post of head of the newspaper. However, he later fell out of favor due to not having sufficiently supported Deng Xiaoping's southern tour speeches, and was removed as chief officer.

In March 1993, he became a standing committee member of the 8th Chinese People's Political Consultative Conference; he retired from front-line politics in 1998.

He was a member of the 12th and 13th Central Committee of the Chinese Communist Party.

Gao died on 26 October 2019 in Changchun, aged 91.

Party political offices
Preceded by Qian Liren	Editor-in-chief of the People's Daily Press; 1989–1992	Succeeded by Shao Huaze
Preceded by Qiang Xiaochu	Party Secretary of Jilin; 1985–1988	Succeeded by He Zhukang
