= People's Daily Press =

Chinese Communist Party publisher

- 人民日报社

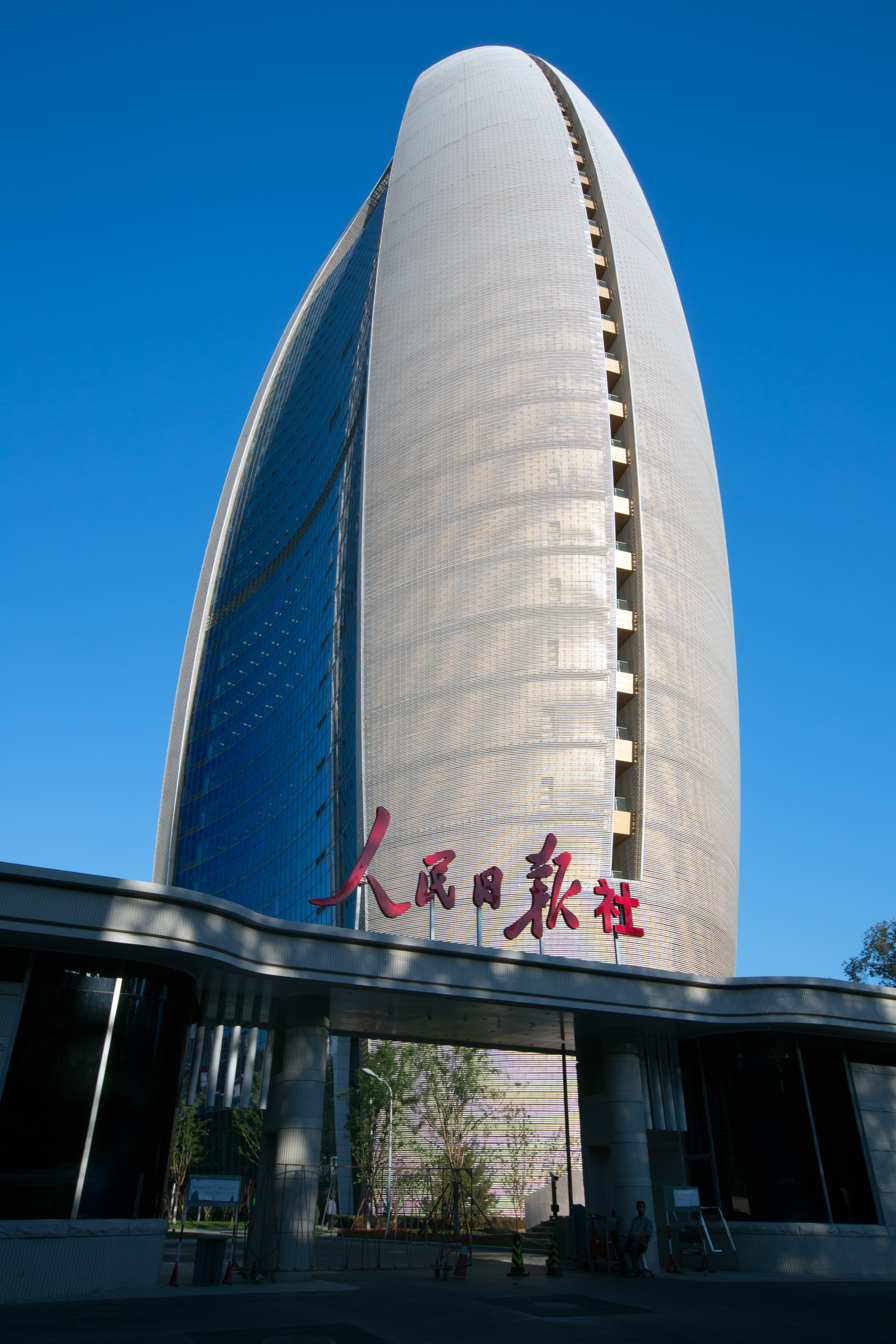
- People's Daily Press headquarters in Beijing
- Formation: 1948; 78 years ago
- Type: Institution directly under the Central Committee; Ministerial level agency
- Headquarters: No. 2 Jintai West Road, Chaoyang District, Beijing
- Coordinates: 39°55′26″N 116°23′55″E
- President: Yu Shaoliang
- Editor-in-chief: Chen Jianwen
- Parent organization: Central Committee of the Chinese Communist Party
- Subsidiaries: People's Daily Online; People's Daily; Global Times
- Website: people.com.cn

People's Daily Press
- Simplified Chinese: 人民日报社
- Traditional Chinese: 人民日報社
Transcriptions
Standard Mandarin
- Hanyu Pinyin: Rénmín Rìbào Shè

The People's Daily Press is a publishing house directly under the Central Committee of the Chinese Communist Party that publishes People's Daily and its associated publications such as Global Times.

== History ==
After the battle of Beijing in 1949, the People's Daily Press took over the office of the North China Daily News at No. 117 (now No. 277) Wangfujing Street.

In 2009, with the approval of the CCP Central Committee, the People's Daily Press carried out organizational and functional adjustments and reforms. Later, it made partial adjustments based on development needs and implemented the "director-in-charge system under the leadership of the editorial committee". Its basic structure is composed of 23 internal institutions, 1 affiliated public institution, 72 dispatched institutions, 30 affiliated newspapers and periodicals, and several affiliated enterprises.

== Organizational structure ==
The People's Daily Press has the following internal structure:

=== Internal organization ===
- General Office
- Editor-in-Chief Office
- News Coordination Department
- Local Department
- Economic and Social Affairs Department
- Political and Cultural Department
- International Department
- Literature and Art Department
- Comments Department
- Theory Department
- Internal Reference Department
- Sports Department
- Research Department
- Personnel Bureau
- Planning and Finance Department
- Management and Security Bureau
- Technology Department
- Department of International Exchange and Cooperation
- Distribution and Publishing Department
- Corporate Regulatory Department
- Party Committee
- Retired Cadres Bureau
- People's Daily Overseas Edition Editorial Department

=== Dispatched agencies ===
==== Domestic branches ====
- Beijing Branch
- Tianjin Branch
- Shanghai Branch
- Chongqing Branch
- Hebei Branch
- Shanxi Branch
- Inner Mongolia Branch
- Liaoning Branch
- Jilin Branch
- Heilongjiang Branch
- Jiangsu Branch
- Zhejiang Branch
- Anhui Branch
- Fujian Branch
- Jiangxi Branch
- Shandong Branch
- Henan Branch
- Hubei Branch
- Hunan Branch
- Guangdong Branch
- Guangxi Branch
- Hainan Branch
- Sichuan Branch
- Guizhou Branch
- Yunnan Branch
- Tibet Branch
- Shaanxi Branch
- Gansu Branch
- Ningxia Branch
- Qinghai Branch
- Xinjiang Branch

==== Special administrative region branches ====
- Hong Kong Branch
- Macau Branch

==== Overseas branches ====
- United Arab Emirates Branch
- Pakistan Branch
- North Korea Branch
- Kazakhstan Branch
- South Korea Branch
- Mongolia Branch
- Japan Branch
- Thailand Branch
- Syria Branch
- Israel Branch
- India Branch
- Indonesia Branch
- Vietnam Branch
- Egypt Branch
- Ivory Coast Branch
- South Africa Branch
- Nigeria Branch
- Tunisia Branch
- Belgium Branch
- Poland Branch
- Germany Branch
- Russia Branch
- France Branch
- Serbia and Montenegro Branch
- Romania Branch
- Swedish Branch
- Ukraine Branch
- Spain Branch
- Italy Branch
- United Kingdom Branch
- Canada Branch
- Washington Branch
- Los Angeles Branch
- Mexico Branch
- Argentina Branch
- Brazil Branch
- Venezuela Branch
- Australia Branch
- United Nations Bureau

=== Directly affiliated institutions ===
- People's Daily New Media Center

=== Directly affiliated enterprise units ===
- People's Daily Publishing House
- People's Daily Printing Factory
- Zhongwen Printing Investment Group

== Publications ==
The People's Daily Press publishes the People's Daily, the People's Daily Overseas Edition, and the People's Daily Tibetan Edition. It has a 56.55 percent controlling stake in People's Daily Online. Ownership of the Haiwainet is split 60–40, respectively, between the People's Daily Online and People's Daily Press. It wholly owns the China Energy and Automobile Communication Group, which publishes China City News and China Automotive News. In addition, the People's Daily Press also oversees and publishes 30 other newspapers and periodicals:

- Global Times
- China Automotive News
- China Energy News
- Health Times
- Securities Times
- International Financial News
- Satire and Humor
- Life Times
- Global Times English Edition
- China Fund News
- China City News
- News Front
- People's Forum
- Global People
- New Security
- China Economic Weekly
- People's Livelihood Weekly
- National Humanities History
- Academic Frontier
- National Governance
- People's Weekly
- Car Tribe
- Automobile and Sports
- Family Car
- Commercial Vehicles
- New Energy Vehicles
- Urban Rail Transit
- Safe Campus

== List of leaders ==
=== Presidents ===
- Zhang Panshi (张磐石)
- Hu Qiaomu (胡乔木)
- Fan Changjiang (范长江)
- Deng Tuo (邓拓)
- Wu Lengxi (吴冷西)
- Chen Boda (陈伯达)
- Hu Jiwei (胡绩伟)
- Qin Chuan (秦川)
- Qian Liren (钱李仁)
- Gao Di (高狄)
- Shao Huaze (邵华泽)
- Bai Keming (白克明)
- Xu Zhongtian (许中田)
- Wang Chen (王晨)
- Zhang Yannong (张研农)
- Yang Zhengwu (杨振武)
- Li Baoshan (李宝善)
- Tuo Zhen (庹震)
