= Yan Zhichan =

Chinese politician (born 1964)

- 严植婵

Deputy Director of the Macau Liaison Office
- In office March 2020 – July 2024
- Premier: Li Keqiang

Director of Organization Department of the CCP Anhui Committee
- In office September 2017 – July 2018
- Preceded by: Deng Xiangyang (邓向阳)
- Succeeded by: Ding Xiangqun

Head of the United Front Work Department of the CCP Guangdong Committee
- In office May 2017 – September 2017
- Preceded by: Lin Xiong (林雄)
- Succeeded by: Zeng Zhiquan

Personal details
- Born: May 1964 (age 62) Yangchun, Guangdong, China
- Party: Chinese Communist Party

Yan Zhichan (Chinese: 严植婵; pinyin: Yán Zhíchán; born May 1964) is a Chinese politician who has served as a committee member on in the National Congress of the Chinese Communist Party. She is serving as a member of the Standing Committee of Guangxi Party Committee. She formerly served as a member of the Anhui Provincial Party Committee, the Director of its Organization Department, and the Director of the United Front Work Department of Guangdong Province.

== Early life ==
Yan was born in Yangchun, Yangjiang, Guangdong province in 1964. After completing her Bachelor's of Law and Master's in Management at Sun Yat-sen University in 1985 she joined the Chinese Communist Party (CCP) to work at the Ministry of Education.

== Political career ==
From 2003 to 2007 Yan was a member of the CCP Zhanjiang Municipal Party Committee and later became its deputy party secretary in 2008. That same year she was promoted to become the committee's main secretary. Three years later she was made deputy party secretary of the Guangdong Provincial Department of Justice.

In 2015 Yan was elected the Party Secretary of Jieyang and later became a committee party member of Guangdong Province as part of the United Front Work Department. In 2017 she became a member of the 19th Central Committee of the Chinese Communist Party.

In 2017, Yan was appointed as a member of the Anhui Provincial Party Committee, and the Director of its Organization Department.

In 2018, Yan was appointed as a member of the Standing Committee of Guangxi Party Committee.

In March 2020, Yan was appointed to serve as the deputy director of the Macau Liaison Office, and left from this position in July 2024.
