= Yu Shaoliang =

Chinese editor and politician

- 于绍良

President of the People's Daily Press
- In office 16 October 2020 – 27 September 2024
- Preceded by: Tuo Zhen

Editor-in-chief of the People's Daily Press
- In office 26 February 2022 – 28 October 2024
- Preceded by: Tuo Zhen
- Succeeded by: Chen Jianwen

Personal details
- Born: 26 July 1964 (age 62) Zanhuang County, Hebei, China
- Party: Chinese Communist Party
- Education: Hebei University; Central Party School of the Chinese Communist Party

Chinese name
- Simplified Chinese: 于绍良
- Traditional Chinese: 于紹良
Transcriptions
Standard Mandarin
- Hanyu Pinyin: Yú Shàoliáng

Yu Shaoliang (Chinese: 于绍良; born 26 July 1964) is a Chinese editor and politician who is the current president of the People's Daily Press, in office since September 2024. From 2022 to 2024, he served as its editor-in-chief He is an alternate of the 19th Central Committee of the Chinese Communist Party.

== Early life and education ==
Yu was born in Zanhuang County, Hebei, on 26 July 1964. After resuming the college entrance examination in 1980, he was accepted to Hebei University, majoring in Chinese language and literature.

== Career in Xinhua News Agency ==
After graduating in 1984, he was assigned to the Hebei Branch of Xinhua News Agency as a journalist. He was promoted to vice president of the Shaanxi Branch of Xinhua News Agency in July 1999, and was promoted again to the president position in September 2004. He was director of the General Office of Xinhua News Agency in December 2008, and held that office until May 2010, when he was appointed director of its Personnel Bureau. He also served as vice president of Xinhua News Agency since July 2014.

== Career in Hubei ==
He was appointed head of Organization Department and president of Provincial Party School in February 2016 and was admitted to member of the Standing Committee of the CCP Hubei Provincial Committee, the province's top authority.

== Career in Shanghai ==
In June 2018, he was transferred to Shanghai and being assigned to the similar position there. He concurrently served as deputy party secretary of Shanghai and secretary of Shanghai Municipal Political and Legal Affairs Commission.

== Career in People's Daily ==
On 26 February 2022, he was appointed chief editor of the People's Daily Press, succeeding Tuo Zhen.

Party political offices
Preceded by He Jiatie	Head of the Organization Department of the Hubei Provincial Committee of the Chinese Communist Party; 2016–2018	Succeeded by Wang Ruilian
Preceded by Wu Jingping	Head of the Organization Department of the Shanghai Municipal Committee of the Chinese Communist Party; 2018–2022	Succeeded by Hu Wenrong
Preceded by Liao Guoxun	Secretary of Shanghai Municipal Political and Legal Affairs Commission; 2020–2022	Succeeded by TBA
Preceded by Liao Guoxun	Deputy Communist Party Secretary of Shanghai; 2020–2022	Succeeded by Zhuge Yujie
Preceded by Tuo Zhen	Editor-in-chief of the People's Daily Press; 2022–2024	Succeeded by Chen Jianwen
Preceded by Tuo Zhen	Editor-in-chief of the People's Daily Press; 2024–	Incumbent
