= April 26 Editorial =

Chinese state-run newspaper article published during the 1989 Tiananmen Square protests

- Simplified Chinese: 四·二六社论
- Traditional Chinese: 四二六社論
- Hanyu Pinyin: Sì'èrliù Shèlùn
Transcriptions
Standard Mandarin
- Hanyu Pinyin: Sì'èrliù Shèlùn

Official name
- Simplified Chinese: 必须旗帜鲜明地反对动乱
- Traditional Chinese: 必須旗幟鮮明地反對動亂
- Hanyu Pinyin: Bìxǖ Qízhì Xiānmíngde Fǎndùi Dòngluàn
- Literal meaning: We Must Take a Clear-cut Stand against Disturbances
Transcriptions
Standard Mandarin
- Hanyu Pinyin: Bìxǖ Qízhì Xiānmíngde Fǎndùi Dòngluàn

The April 26 Editorial was a front-page article published in People's Daily on April 26, 1989, during the Tiananmen Square protests. The editorial effectively defined the student movement as a destabilizing anti-party revolt that should be resolutely opposed at all levels of society. As the first authoritative document from the top leadership on the growing movement, it was widely interpreted as having communicated the party's zero-tolerance position to student protesters and their sympathizers.

The contents of the editorial were derived from a meeting of the Politburo Standing Committee (PSC) during the 13th Politburo of the Chinese Communist Party (CCP) at the residence of Deng Xiaoping on the morning of April 25. During the meeting, the PSC came to the general agreement that the students aimed to overthrow Communist rule and were being heavily influenced by similar anti-Communist movements in Eastern Europe. As such, it threatened the survival of the existing senior leadership, the CCP, and the political system itself. Deputy chief of propaganda Zeng Jianhui wrote the draft, while Hu Qili and Li Peng served as editors. On the evening of April 25, the finished editorial could be heard on national radio and television news stations.

The editorial enraged the student protesters, widened the chasm between the students and the CCP leadership, and emerged as a sore point of contention for the rest of the movement. Students protested in large numbers on April 27, and thereafter continuously asked for the editorial to be retracted. Within the party leadership, Zhao Ziyang advocated for the editorial to be "toned down" or rescinded, but faced significant opposition and was unsuccessful.

== Contents ==
Titled "We Must Take a Clear-cut Stand against Disturbances", the editorial begins by addressing the entire population of China, acknowledging their diverse expressions of grief. Specifically referencing the need to "turn grief into strength", the editorial suggests that the poignancy of Hu Yaobang's death reaffirms the significance of upholding the four modernizations. Carried out by "an extremely small number of people", subversive responses, which the editorial describes as mostly verbal denunciations of the CCP, are an example of "abnormal phenomena" to be dealt with swiftly.

Focusing in on the students, the editorial references their assembly at Tiananmen Square on April 22 in an effort to participate in Hu's official memorial. The CCP, acknowledging that the state of mourning creates "emotionally agitated" students, demonstrated "tolerance and restraint" towards this gathering, and the memorial was allowed to proceed without difficulty. The fundamental problem, according to the editorial, is that "an extremely small number of people with ulterior purposes" have taken advantage of students, teachers, and even workers, to promote a "reactionary" message against Party leadership. The editorial describes this small group of people as not grieving, but executing a "planned conspiracy" to "plunge the whole country into chaos and sabotage", in order to "negate the leadership of the CPC and the socialist system". This accusation declares actions like the spreading of rumours, the use of posters, and the forming of unions, as completely detrimental to the future of the nation. To put this in perspective, the editorial suggests that "reactionary" behaviour could potentially reverse the economic progress made by Deng Xiaoping's program of reform and opening up. According to the editorial, this jeopardizes existing initiatives to control prices, eliminate corruption, and take on political reform.

The editorial therefore calls on the population to help stabilize the political status quo by refusing to take part in any disturbances. Illegal unions, rumour mongering, and "unlawful parades and demonstrations" are presented as not only violations against the state, but also against a student's right to study. The editorial ends by alluding to a general agreement among students and the Party to eliminate corruption and promote democracy, emphasizing the need to end disturbances for China to move forward.

== Intellectual critique ==
In mid-May 1989, author Wang Ruowang published a rebuttal, arguing vehemently against the editorial. Wang calls the accusation toward "people with ulterior motives" conveniently ambiguous since it allows the Party to target virtually anyone for persecution. He also claims that the editorial lacks evidence when referring to incidents like the shouting of "reactionary" slogans. Still, Wang argues, it deliberately mentions these incidents to provide a pretext for the Party to suppress demonstrators. While he sees the editorial as an attempt to reaffirm the authority of the Party, he argues that it has actually been counterproductive on this point. Wang suggests that by threatening the students, the editorial itself provokes tension, effectively heightening the disturbances it had hoped to curb.

== Influence on the protests ==
Throughout the Tiananmen Square protests, the editorial remained a major point of contention, as Party members argued about its message and students called for its retraction. General Secretary Zhao Ziyang, recognizing the editorial's negative consequences, repeatedly made the suggestion among his colleagues to revise it. First, in a private conversation with Premier Li Peng, Zhao explained that though he himself supported the editorial, it had become "a real sore point" with students, creating an "us-versus-them mentality" that could be eased with a simple tweaking of the editorial's tone. Li, on the other hand, argued that the editorial could not be altered, first because it was completely accurate, but also because it was a manifestation of Deng Xiaoping's views, which could not be questioned. As the movement progressed into a hunger strike, Zhao again pushed to revise the editorial, with the belief that settling the sensitive topic would effectively ease tension. Following his resignation, Zhao made one last gesture urging Deng to "change the official view of the student movement" from the editorial's perspective, but by this point, he had been discredited within the Party and his proposal was rejected.

Around this same time in mid-May, an attempt to end the hunger strike with dialogue further displayed the editorial's resonance. Speaking to Li Peng, student leader Wu'erkaixi identified the description of the movement as "turmoil" as a major issue concerning the hunger strikers. He presented as a solution the publishing of a new, apologetic People's Daily editorial, "repudiating the one published on April 26". In response, Li denied ever labeling the movement as turmoil, and no apologetic editorial was published.

== See also ==
- People's Daily during the 1989 Student Movement
