= Chen Jianwen =

Chinese politician

- 陈建文

Editor-in-chief of the People's Daily Press
- Incumbent
- Assumed office 28 October 2024
- Preceded by: Yu Shaoliang

Head of Publicity Department of Guangdong Provincial Committee of the Chinese Communist Party
- In office March 2021 – 28 October 2024
- Preceded by: Zhang Fuhai
- Succeeded by: Hu Jinjun

Personal details
- Born: September 1965 (age 61) Longhai County, Fujian, China
- Party: Chinese Communist Party
- Education: Fujian Normal University; Beijing Normal University

Chinese name
- Simplified Chinese: 陈建文
- Traditional Chinese: 陳建文
Transcriptions
Standard Mandarin
- Hanyu Pinyin: Chén Jiànwén

Chen Jianwen (Chinese: 陈建文; born September 1965) is a Chinese politician, currently serving as the editor-in-chief of the People's Daily Press. He previously served as the head of Publicity Department of the CCP Guangdong Provincial Committee.

He is an alternate of the 20th Central Committee of the Chinese Communist Party.

== Biography ==
Chen was born in Longhai County (now Longhai District of Zhangzhou), Fujian, in September 1965. In 1982, he entered Fujian Normal University, where he majored in Chinese language and literature.

After graduating in 1986, he taught at the Fuzhou Branch of Fujian Radio and Television University. In 1993, he became a postgraduate at Beijing Normal University, where he worked after graduation. He joined the Chinese Communist Party (CCP) in December 1994.

Starting in April 2002, he served in several posts in the Publicity Department of the CCP Beijing Municipal Committee, including director of Publicity Department, director of Theory Department, and director of Cultural Department. From December 2009 to April 2011, he was a director of the Office of the Capital Spiritual Civilization Construction Committee.

In April 2011, he was assigned to the China Federation of Literary and Art Circles, where he eventually becoming vice chairman in January 2019.

Chen was appointed head of Publicity Department of the CCP Guangdong Provincial Committee in March 2021, and was admitted to member of the Standing Committee of the CCP Guangdong Provincial Committee, the province's top authority.

Party political offices
Preceded by Zhang Fuhai	Head of Publicity Department of Guangdong Provincial Committee of the Chinese Communist Party; 2021–2024	Succeeded by Hu Jinjun
