= Shen Haixiong =

Chinese journalist and Communist Party official

- 慎海雄
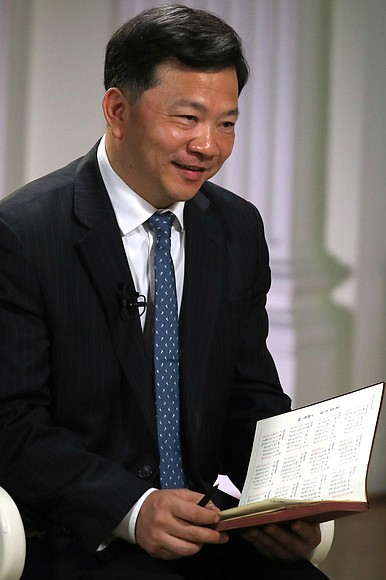
- Shen in 2018

Deputy Head of the Publicity Department of the Chinese Communist Party
- Incumbent
- Assumed office March 2018
- Head: Huang Kunming; Li Shulei

President of the China Media Group
- Incumbent
- Assumed office 21 March 2018
- Premier: Li Keqiang; Li Qiang
- Preceded by: Office established

Personal details
- Born: April 4, 1967 (age 59) Wuxing, Huzhou, Zhejiang, China
- Party: Chinese Communist Party
- Education: Executive MBA; Bachelor's Degree
- Alma mater: Shanghai Jiaotong University; Hangzhou University

Shen Haixiong (Chinese: 慎海雄; pinyin: Shèn Hǎixióng; born April 4, 1967) is a Chinese journalist and propaganda official, serving as a deputy head of the Publicity Department of the Chinese Communist Party and head of the China Media Group, the umbrella state media organization.

== Biography ==
Shen was born in Wuxing, Huzhou, Zhejiang. He earned a bachelor's degree in Chinese at Hangzhou University, then an executive MBA from Shanghai Jiaotong University. He spent much of his career as a reporter and news editor, starting at the Zhejiang provincial division of Xinhua News Agency, then the editor-in-chief of the Shanghai branch of Xinhua, specializing in finance. He was selected for the "ten best Xinhua journalists" award in its inaugural year. In addition, he has worked in Korean Broadcasting System and Asahi Shimbun for more than five years. During much of this time he worked under Xi Jinping, who was Community Party secretary in Zhejiang then Shanghai. In 2010, while serving in Shanghai, he was named "outstanding and progressive individual" by the Chinese government for his work at Expo 2010 in Shanghai. In August 2012 he was elevated to deputy editor-in-chief of Xinhua, then in July 2014 the deputy director of the agency (vice-minister level).

In July 2015, Shen was transferred to become a member of the provincial Party Standing Committee of Guangdong and provincial propaganda chief. On 21 March 2018, Shen was appointed as the head of China Central Television (CCTV). At the time, he was appointed as the President of China Media Group, which is the combination of China Central Television, China National Radio and China Radio International.

Government offices
Preceded by Himself as President of China Central Television	President of China Media Group; 21 March 2018 –	Incumbent
Preceded by Yan Xiaoming as President of China National Radio	President of China Media Group; 21 March 2018 –	Incumbent
Preceded by Wang Gengnian as President of China Radio International	President of China Media Group; 21 March 2018 –	Incumbent
Preceded by Nie Chenxi	President of China Central Television; 9 February 2018 – 21 March 2018	Post abolished
Party political offices
Preceded by Tuo Zhen	Head of the Publicity Department of the Guangdong Provincial Committee of the Chinese Communist Party; 2015–2018	Succeeded by Fu Hua
