= People's Daily =

Chinese Communist Party newspaper

- Logo and masthead of the People's Daily, a calligraphic inscription handwritten by Mao Zedong in traditional Chinese

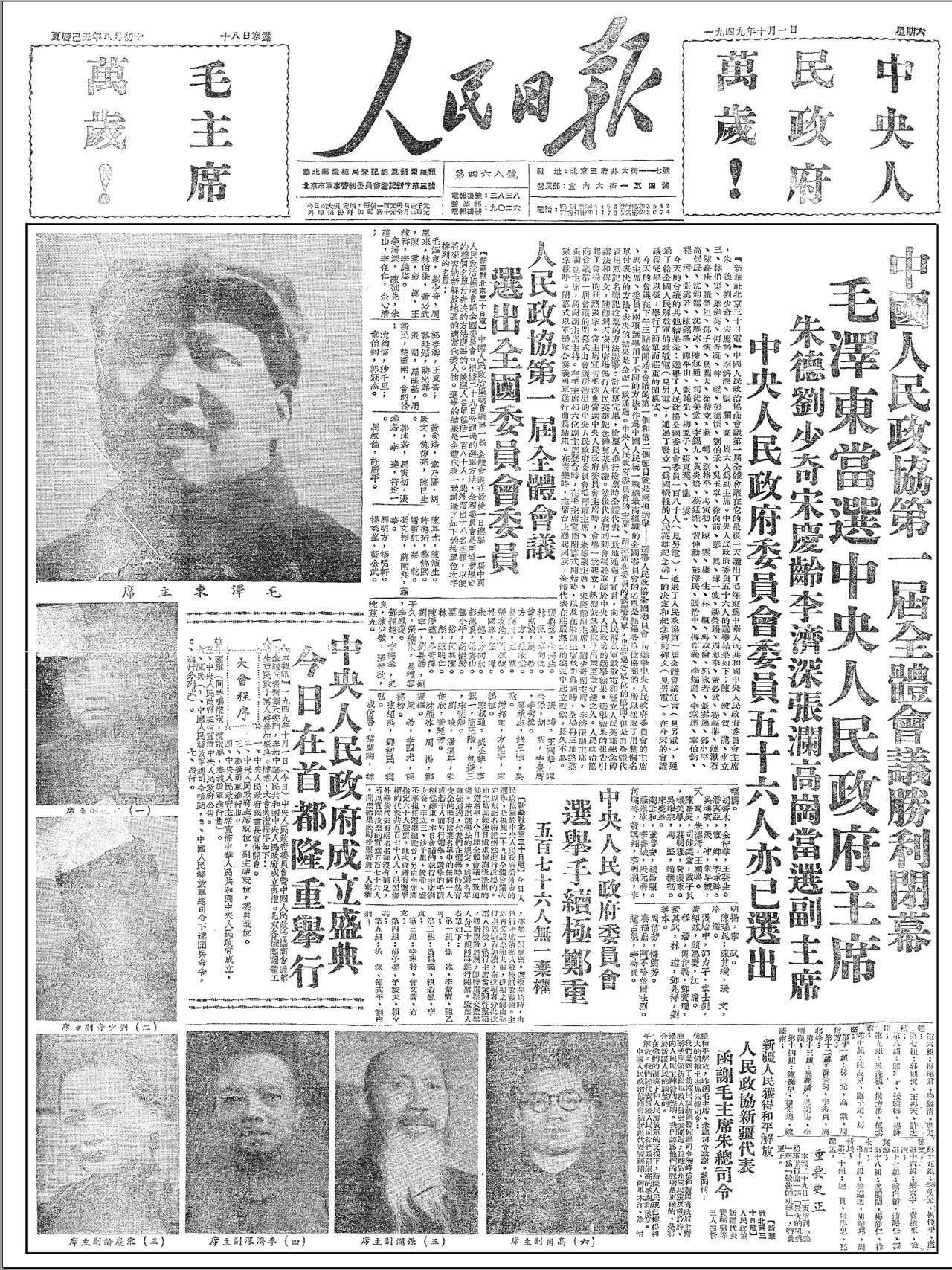
- Front page on 1 October 1949 (Proclamation of the People's Republic of China)
- Native name: 人民日报
- Type: Daily newspaper
- Owner: Central Committee of the Chinese Communist Party
- Publisher: People's Daily Press
- President: Tuo Zhen
- Editor: Yu Shaoliang
- Founded: 15 June 1948; 78 years ago
- Political alignment: Chinese Communist Party
- Language: Chinese and others
- Headquarters: No. 2 Jintai Xilu, Chaoyang District, Beijing
- Country: China
- OCLC number: 1011095986
- Website: en.people.cn

Chinese name
- Simplified Chinese: 人民日报
- Traditional Chinese: 人民日報
Transcriptions
Standard Mandarin
- Hanyu Pinyin: Rénmín Rìbào
- Gwoyeu Romatzyh: Renmin Ryhbaw
- Wade–Giles: Jen-min Jih-pao

The People's Daily is the official newspaper of the Central Committee of the Chinese Communist Party (CCP). It was established in 1948 during the Chinese Civil War as the organ of the CCP's North China Bureau and first published in Pingshan County, Hebei. Its offices moved to Beijing in February 1949, before it became the organ of the CCP Central Committee in August of that year. During the Cultural Revolution, it fell under the control of the Gang of Four and was counted among the "Two Newspapers and One Journal." During the 1989 Tiananmen Square protests and massacre, the paper became a contested ground between hardline party leaders and sympathetic editors. In 1997, the paper launched an online edition, which was reorganized as People's Daily Online in 2000.

== History ==
The paper was established on 15 June 1948 and was first published in Pingshan County, Hebei. It was formed from the merger of the Jin-Cha-Ji Daily and the newspapers of the Jin-Ji-Lu-Yu base area. On 15 March 1949, its office was moved to Beijing, and the original People's Daily Beijing edition was renamed Beijing Liberation Daily. The newspaper ceased publication on 31 July 1949, with a total of 406 issues published. Since the newspaper was the official newspaper of the North China Bureau of the CCP, it was historically known as the North China People's Daily or the People's Daily North China Edition. At the same time, in order to indicate that the newspaper was published in Pingshan County, Hebei, it was also called the People's Daily Pingshan Edition. On 1 August 1949, the People's Daily became the official newspaper of CCP Central Committee.

Ever since its founding, the People's Daily has been under direct control of the CCP's top leadership. Deng Tuo and Wu Lengxi served as editor-in-chief from 1948 to 1958 and 1958–1966, respectively, but the paper was in fact controlled by Mao Zedong's personal secretary Hu Qiaomu.

At the outset of the Cultural Revolution, the leadership of many news outlets was purged; Wu Lengxi replaced Deng Tuo as the paper's editor-in-chief. Amid the treacherous political currents of the period, the People's Daily lost its editorial direction. On the afternoon of 31 May 1966, Chen Boda led a work team in what he described as "a small coup" at the paper, seizing control from Wu Lengxi and the editorial board. Following this, the People's Daily and Red Flag came under a work team headed by Chen, then head of the Central Cultural Revolution Group, and came to be known as the "Two Newspapers and One Journal," along with People's Liberation Army Daily. On 1 June, the People's Daily published a militant editorial entitled "Sweep Away All Cow Demons and Snake Spirits," advocating for the Cultural Revolution and struggle against "rightists."

In the late 1970s, the editor-in-chief, Hu Jiwei, as part of China's larger debate over the role of journalism, argued for the primacy of the "people's spirit" asserting that state media should report truthfully to represent the interests of the public, remain independent from the structural party, and ensure that "party spirit" aligned with human nature. He maintained that the press should serve as the "eyes and ears of the CCP" to accurately reflect reality and convey the voices of the citizens to the leadership. While his reformist stance was endorsed by CCP General Secretary Hu Yaobang, it faced opposition from hardline ideologue Hu Qiaomu, who advocated for the absolute primacy of the "party spirit" and, along with other party conservatives, forced Hu Jiwei to resign in 1983. Despite that, the People's Daily continued to follow Hu Jiwei's vision in the 1980s, notably featuring Liu Binyan's investigative journalism.

During the 1989 student movement, the People's Daily became a contested ground between its sympathetic staff and hardline party leaders. Under pressure, the paper published the April 26 editorial, penned by deputy publicity minister Zeng Jianhui at the direction of Deng Xiaoping, which sharply escalated tensions between the government and protesters. On 4 June, the day of the Tiananmen Square massacre, the People's Daily was the only major newspaper in China to report on its front page that the army had killed civilians in Beijing, juxtaposing the news amid official government announcements. Many headlines and layouts in that day's issue served as implicit protests; for instance, the international page was headlined by students protesting the government massacre during the Gwangju Uprising, while a report on a sports meet for people with disabilities was headlined "An Unconquerable Heart." Following the massacre, the paper's leadership was purged, and editor Wu Xuecan was sentenced to four years in prison.

The People's Daily maintains a unit called People's Data that conducts overseas social media data collection and analysis for police, judicial authorities, and CCP organizations. People's Data also has data sharing agreements in place with various companies such as DiDi and Temu's parent company Pinduoduo. In 2022, the People's Daily launched a commercial software service called Renmin Shenjiao (People's Proofreader) that provides outsourced content censorship. The People's Daily also provides artificial intelligence companies in China with training data that CCP leaders consider permissible. In 2024, the People's Daily released a large language model-based tool called Easy Write.

== Content ==
The People's Daily is published by the People's Daily Press, a ministerial-level institution. The agency is also responsible for the publication of the nationalist tabloid Global Times. The newspaper is published worldwide in four editions:

- Mainland China Edition: Mainly for readers in mainland China
- Hong Kong Edition: Mainly for readers in Hong Kong
- Overseas Edition: Mainly for readers outside mainland China and Hong Kong
- Tibetan version: mainly for Tibetan readers in the Tibet Autonomous Region and Tibetan-populated areas in Sichuan, Yunnan, Qinghai, Gansu and other provinces of China.

The Mainland Edition is the domestic edition, and the name of the edition is not clearly stated. The Mainland Edition initially had four pages, and later developed to 24 pages from Monday to Friday, 12 pages on Saturday and Sunday, and eight pages on holidays. From 2019, it started to have 20 pages on weekdays and 8 pages on weekends and holidays, which have been printed in full color. In addition, the People's Daily Publishing House issues reduced-print bound volumes of the People's Daily, one volume every half month, 24 volumes per year, and the content and layout are basically the same as the original newspaper.

=== Overseas edition ===
The overseas edition of the People's Daily was launched on 1 July 1985, and was originally published in traditional Chinese characters. After 1 July 1992, it was changed to simplified Chinese characters. Haiwainet is the website of the overseas edition.

In March 2018, BBC News pointed out that Haiwainet was the real body of All American Television, located in Pasadena, California and that Haiwainet's American channel and All American Television were "one institution with two names". However, Haiwainet denied the allegations and stated it "had no relationship with All American Television" or with the station's executive director Zhang Huijun. Subsequently, the Seattle-based All American Television Corporation (AAT Television Corporation) also issued a statement saying that it had no relationship with All American Television.

=== Internet ===
The People's Daily also maintains a multilingual internet presence and established the People's Daily Online in 1997. The website of People's Daily includes content in Arabic, French, Russian, Spanish, Japanese and English. In comparison to the original Chinese version, the foreign-language version offers less in-depth discussion of domestic policies and affairs and more editorials about China's foreign policies and motives. The People's Daily in recent years has been expanding on overseas social media platforms. It has millions of followers on its Facebook page and its accounts on Instagram, Twitter and YouTube. An unusually high proportion of its followers are virtually inactive and are likely to be fake users, according to a study by the Committee to Protect Journalists. The People's Daily also maintains agreements with foreign newspapers to republish its content.

=== Editorial style ===
The newspaper is the official "mouthpiece" (Chinese: 喉舌; lit. 'throat tongue') of the Central Committee of the Chinese Communist Party. It is often viewed as most representative of the mainstream perspective of China's government and the CCP leadership's priorities.

A large number of articles devoted to a political figure, idea, or geographic focus is often taken as a sign that the mentioned official or subject is rising. Editorials in the People's Daily are regarded both by foreign observers and Chinese readers as authoritative statements of official government policy. Distinction is made between editorials, commentaries, and opinions. Although all must be government-approved, they differ sharply on the amount of official authoritativeness they contain by design, from the top. For example, although an opinion piece is unlikely to contain views opposed to those of the government, it may express a viewpoint, or it may contain a debate that is under consideration and reflect only the opinions of the writer: an editorial trial balloon to assess internal public opinion. By contrast, an official editorial, which is rather infrequent, means that the government has reached a final decision on an issue.

=== Writing practices ===
The People's Daily employs "writing task groups" (Chinese: 写作小组; pinyin: xiězuò xiǎozǔ) of various staff to compose editorial pieces to signal the significance of certain pieces or their relationship to the official views of the CCP. These groups are published under "signatures" (i.e., pen names: 署名 shǔmíng) that may correspond with the topic and weight of a piece, and what specific government or CCP body is backing it, often with homophonous references to their purpose.

Selected notable People's Daily pen names
Pen name	Etymology/symbolism	Usage	Example articles	Ref
Ren Zhongping 任仲平	From 人民日报重要评论 Rénmín Rìbào zhòngyào pínglùn 'important People's Daily commentary'	Used to represent the view of the People's Daily as an organization.	"Hong Kong scores brilliant achievements after return", June 2017 "Keeping original aspiration, CPC creates glorious achievements", September 2019	
Zhong Sheng 钟声	Homophone of 中声 Zhōng shēng 'voice of China'	Commentary on major international affairs by editors and staff.	"U.S. practice to claim compensation for COVID-19 outbreak a shame for human civilization", May 2020	
Guo Jiping 国纪平	From 有关国际的重要评论 yǒuguān guójì de zhòngyào pínglùn 'important commentary on international [matters]'	According to China Daily, Guo Jiping is "used for People's Daily editorials meant to outline China's stance and viewpoints on major international issues." Guo Jiping articles are rarer and generally longer than Zhong Sheng articles.	"Losing no time in progressing – grasping the historic opportunity for common development", December 2019	
Guo Ping 国平	Unclear. Guó means 'country' and píng 'peace, calm'. Píng is also the last character in Xi Jinping's name.	Articles that focus on Xi Jinping and his political thought.	"Better Grasp Contemporary China's Destiny during Reform: On the New Thought and New Achievements of Xi Jinping in Governing the Country," February 2016	
Zhong Zuwen 仲祖文	From 中共中央组织部文章 Zhōnggòng Zhōngyāng Zǔzhībù wénzhāng 'articles from the Central Party Organization Department'	Pieces from the Organization Department of the Chinese Communist Party, covering topics related to the Party principles and ideology.	"Moral standards for officials' personal life necessary", July 2010	
Zheng Qingyuan 郑青原	Taken from the saying 正本清源 zhèngběn qīngyuán 'clarify matters and get to the bottom of things'.	Used to comment on political reform, particularly in attacking Western-style liberal democracy. A writer from the Beijing Morning Post (now part of The Beijing News) speculated that it represented the Politburo in an article that was taken down within a day in China.	"China to promote reform with greater resolve, courage", October 2010	
Tang Xiaowen 唐晓文	Similar to 党校文 dǎngxiào wén 'Party School writing'	Central Party School editorials written during the Cultural Revolution by a group under the leadership of Kang Sheng.	"Is Confucius really an 'educator for the entire people'?", September 1973	
Yue Ping 岳平 (historical)	For special guest commentator 特约评论员 tèyuē pínglùnyuán	Used from March 1978 to December 1985 to republish select articles from the internal Party periodical Theoretical Trends (理论动态) under the direction of Hu Yaobang.	"Actual Practice is the Sole Criterion for Judging Truth", May 1978 (originally published in Guangming Daily)	

== Reactions ==
During the AIDS epidemic, the People's Daily downplayed the epidemic domestically while "presenting AIDS as a relatively innocuous social problem for the country."

A 2013 study of the People's Daily coverage of the 2002–2004 SARS outbreak reported that it "regurgitated triumph and optimism" and framed the outbreak as an "opportunity to showcase China's scientific achievements, and the strength of national spirits, as well as the wise leadership of the party and effective measures to protect the lives of ordinary citizens."

In February 2020, the People's Daily published an article stating that the novel coronavirus "did not necessarily originate in China." In March 2020, the online insert of the People's Daily, distributed by The Daily Telegraph, published an article stating that Traditional Chinese medicine "helps fight coronavirus." In May 2020, the People's Daily stated that the novel coronavirus had "multiple origins." In November 2020, the People's Daily published a claim that COVID-19 was "imported" into China. In January 2021, the People's Daily inaccurately attributed deaths in Norway to the Pfizer–BioNTech COVID-19 vaccine. A 2023 discourse analysis published by the Journal of Current Chinese Affairs found that the People's Daily's English-language coverage during the COVID-19 pandemic "appears to be in the thick of the global information war; it never provides just information, but always also has an angle, argues a point, or defends China's position in response to an accusation."

In 2020, the United States Department of State designated the People's Daily a foreign mission, thereby requiring it to disclose more information about its operations in the U.S.

In 2021, ProPublica and The New York Times reported that the People's Daily was part of a coordinated state propaganda campaign to deny human rights abuses in Xinjiang.

In 2023, the People's Daily sparked a backlash on Chinese social media for exhorting citizens not to complain about their own poverty or boredom.

In 2025, the People's Daily published an op-ed under LeBron James's byline, with an appended note stating that it had been compiled after being interviewed by a reporter for the newspaper. James's representative said that the piece was not written by him, but was based on a series of non-exclusive group interviews given during his trip to China.

== See also ==
- Mass media in China
- Xinhua News Agency
- Qiushi
- Rodong Sinmun, North Korean counterpart
