= Fifth-generation warfare =

Warfare conducted without the use of lethal force

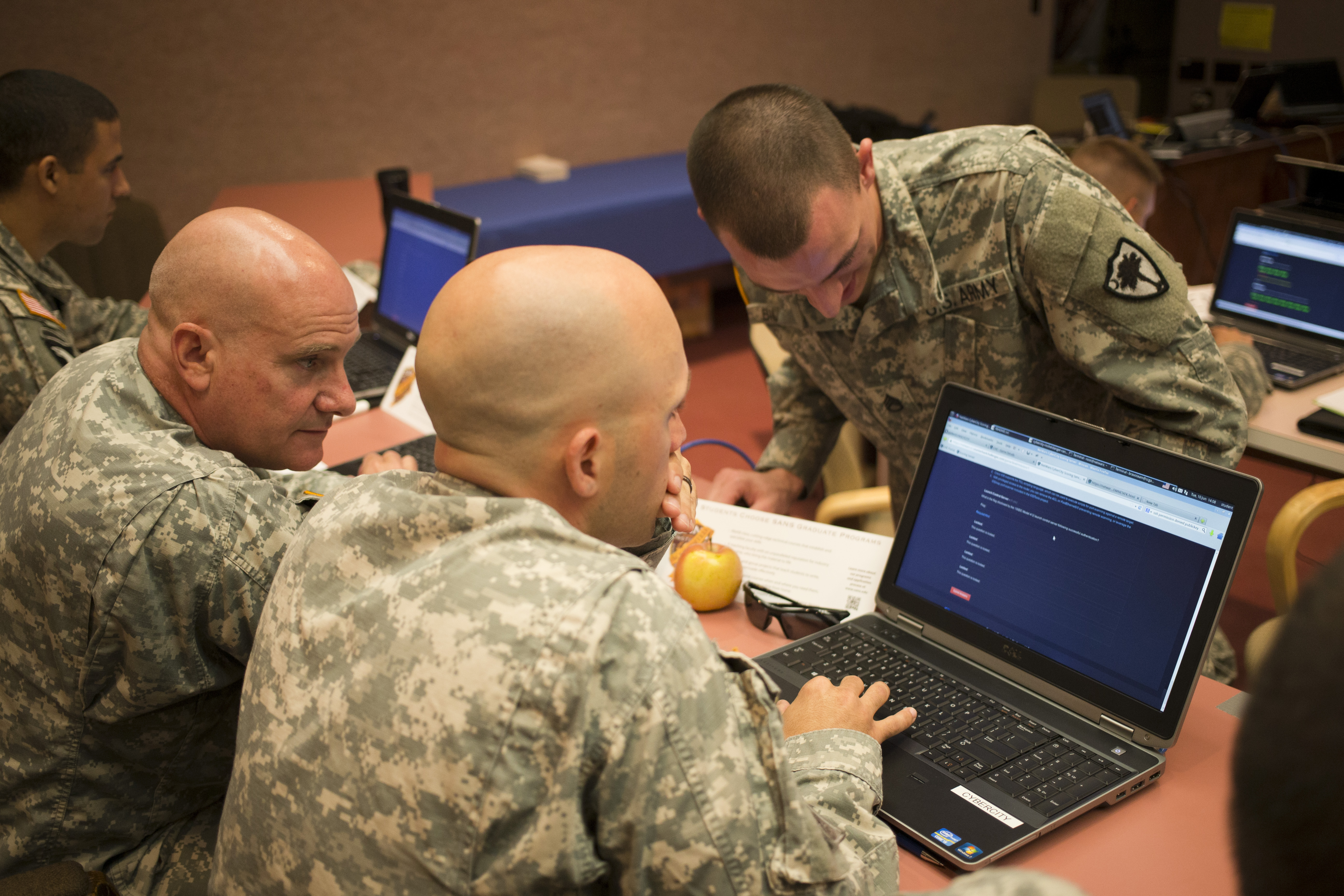
United States Cyber-guards during training in preparation for cyberwarfare

Fifth-generation warfare (5GW) is warfare that is conducted primarily through non-kinetic military action, such as social engineering, misinformation, cyberattacks, along with emerging technologies such as artificial intelligence and fully autonomous systems. Fifth generation warfare has been described by Daniel Abbot as a war of "information and perception". There is no widely agreed upon definition of fifth-generation warfare, and it has been rejected by some scholars, including William S. Lind, who was one of the original theorists of fourth-generation warfare.

== History ==
The term 'fifth-generation warfare' was first used in 2003 by Robert Steele. The following year, Lind criticised the concept, arguing that the fourth generation had yet to fully materialize.

In 2008, the term was used by Terry Terriff, who presented the 2003 ricin letters as a potential example, but stated that he was not entirely sure if it was a fifth-generation attack, claiming "we may not recognize it as it resolves around us. Or we might look at several alternative futures and see each as fifth generation." Terriff argued that the information revolution allows "super-empowered individuals" or small groups of malcontents to take matters into their own hands through Fifth Generation Warfare. These individuals or groups may be able to make political statements through terrorism, but they will lack the political power to actually have their demands met.

In 2017, the JAPCC published an article defining 'fifth-generation' in the context of fighter aircraft. The article describes sensors, communications and other electronics playing a key role. While this is not a definition of 5GW itself, 'fifth-generation' was first coined as a military term in the context of fifth generation fighter aircraft.

== Characteristics ==
Alex P. Schmid said that fifth-generation warfare is typified by its "omnipresent battlefield", and the fact that people engaged in it do not necessarily use military force, instead employing a mixture of kinetic and non-kinetic force. In the 1999 book Unrestricted Warfare, by colonels Qiao Liang and Wang Xiangsui of the People's Liberation Army, they noted that in the years since the 1991 Gulf War, conventional military violence had decreased, which correlated to an increase in "political, economic, and technological violence", which they argued could be more devastating than a conventional war.

In Unrestricted Warfare, the authors also write "No, what we are referring to are not changes in the instruments of war, the technology of war, the modes of war, or the forms of war. What we are referring to is the function of warfare". Additionally, a very short paper published by the think tank 360iSR mentions that “We are no longer fighting a defined adversary in a defined battlespace for a defined period of time. Instead the 5th generation mission space is a continuous global battle of narratives that will play out over both virtual and physical space and encompass a range of violent and non-violent actions and effects."

In 2009, an article in the Marine Corps Gazette written by Lt Col Stanton S. Coerr described the symptoms of fifth-generation warfare as "The battlefield will be something strange- cyberspace, or the Cleveland water supply, or Wall Street's banking systems, or YouTube. The mission will be instilling fear, and it will succeed."

L.C. Rees described the nature of fifth generation warfare as difficult to define in itself, alluding to the third law of science fiction author Arthur C. Clarke – "any sufficiently advanced technology is indistinguishable from magic."

Fifth-generation warfare has been characterized as potentially containing the following characteristics:

- Cyber attacks that may not be attributable to an actor or nation-state, or even be recognised as such by outsiders (simply being perceived as 'outages'),
- Social engineering via techniques such as gaslighting used to manipulate targets into thinking in a way the belligerents desire,
- Spontaneous conflicts with no clear build-up to outsiders that may not make sense,
- And attacks by non-state actors; rather than terrorist groups which make up part of 4GW, non-state actors in 5GW can also mean private corporations.

== See also ==
- Counterinsurgency
- New generation warfare
- Radicalism (politics)
- Subversion
