= Generations of warfare =

Theory in the history of war

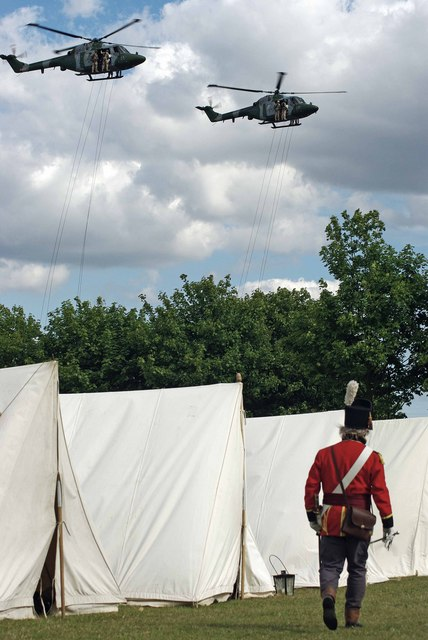
A British Napoleonic Wars reenactor watching modern military helicopters fly over his camp, exemplifying the vast differences in each generation of warfare

In military history, the term "generations of warfare" refers to the concept of five "generations" in warfare, with each generation having different tactics, strategies, and technologies. The generations of warfare are sometimes dubbed as "4GW" or "5GW". The term originated in 1989 to describe "the changing face of war" over time, initially only referring to the emergence of the fourth generation, but eventually seeing the addition of a fifth generation.

== Typology ==
- First-generation warfare, the most long-running of all generations, refers tp conflicts during ancient history, post-classical, and early modern battles fought with massed manpower, using phalanx, line, pike and shot, and column tactics with uniformed soldiers governed by the state. This generation came to an end around the mid-nineteenth century due to rapid improvements in the range, accuracy, and rate-of-fire of many weapon systems.
- Second-generation warfare refers to military revolution and industrial warfare, evolving after the invention of the rifled musket and breech-loading weapons and continuing through the development of the machine gun and indirect fire. This generation predates the widespread effective use of motorised vehicles in battle and combined arms. The term second generation warfare was created by the U.S. military in 1989.
- Third-generation warfare focuses on using late modern technology-derived tactics of leveraging speed, stealth, and surprise to bypass the enemy's lines and collapse their forces from the rear. Essentially, this was the end of linear warfare on a tactical level, with units seeking not simply to meet each other face to face but to outmaneuver each other to gain the greatest advantage. Armoured units, military aircraft, and airborne forces began to play an increasingly critical role in operations, with the development of strategies such as Blitzkrieg and deep operation.
- Fourth-generation warfare as presented by Lind et al. is characterized by a post-modern return to decentralized forms of warfare, blurring of the lines between war and politics, and between combatants and civilians, due to states' loss of their near-monopoly on combat forces, returning to modes of conflict common in pre-modern times. Guerrilla groups, private military contractors, and paramilitary organisations play a prominent role in fourth-generation warfare.
- Fifth-generation warfare is conducted fort the most part through non-kinetic military action, such as social engineering, misinformation, and cyberattacks, along with emerging technologies such as artificial intelligence and fully autonomous systems. Fifth generation warfare has been described by Daniel Abbot as a war of "information and perception".

== First generation ==
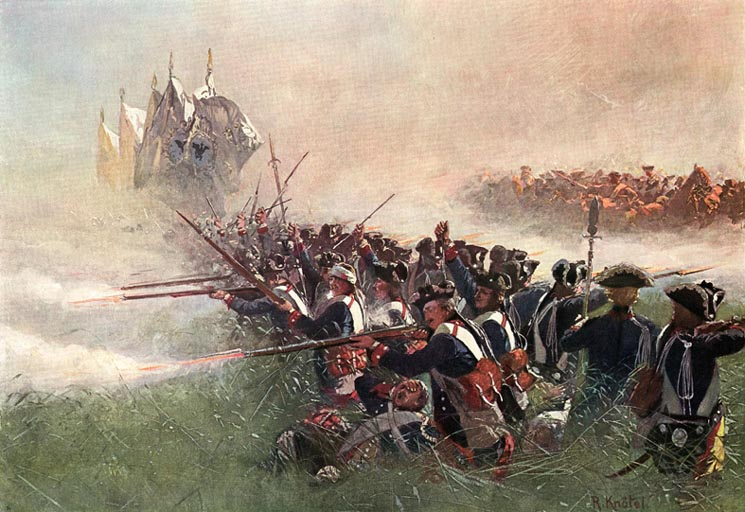
A Prussian Leibgarde battalion using line and column formation tactics during the Seven Years' War

In 1648, at the end of the Thirty Years' War, the Treaty of Westphalia gave a practical sovereignty to the German states, which until then were semi-independent components of the Holy Roman Empire. This more firmly established the sovereignty of the nation state, which meant, among other things, that governments would have exclusive rights to organize and maintain their own militaries. Before this time, many armies and nations were controlled by religious orders and many wars were fought in melee combat, or subversively through bribery and assassination. The first generation of modern warfare was intended to create a straightforward and orderly means of waging war.

Alternatively, it has been argued that the Peace of Westphalia did not solidify the power of the nation state, but that the Thirty Years' War itself ushered in an era of large-scale combat that was simply too costly for smaller mercenary groups to carry out on their own. According to this theory, smaller groups chose to leave mass combat—and the expenses associated with it—in the domain of the nation-state.

The increased accuracy and speed of the rifled musket and the breech-loader marks the end of first generation warfare; the concept of vast lines of soldiers meeting face to face became impractical due to the heavy casualties that could be sustained. Because these technologies were adopted gradually throughout the Americas and Europe, the exact end of the first generation of modern warfare depends on the region, but all world powers had moved on by the latter half of the 19th century.

In order to create a more controlled environment for warfare, a military culture was developed that, in many ways, is still visible in the armed forces of today. Specially crafted uniforms set soldiers apart from the general populace.

An elaborate structure of rank was developed to better organize men into units. Rules for military drills were perfected, allowing line and column maneuvers to be executed with more precision, and to increase the rate of fire in battle.

Control of media and information released during the war and the production of counterfeit money in order to devaluate the enemy's economy were used for the first time during the Napoleonic Wars.

=== Examples ===
- American Revolutionary War
- Anglo-Spanish War
- Carnatic wars
- Crimean War
- English Civil War
- First Anglo-Maratha War
- First Anglo-Sikh War
- First Italian War of Independence
- First Schleswig War
- Franco-Dutch War
- French Revolutionary Wars
- Great Northern War
- Great Turkish War
- Hungarian Revolution of 1848
- Mexican War of Independence
- Napoleonic Wars
- Second Anglo-Maratha War
- Second Anglo-Sikh War
- Seven Years' War
- Texas Revolution
- Thirty Years' War
- War of 1812
- War of the Austrian Succession
- War of the Bavarian Succession
- War of the Spanish Succession

== Second generation ==
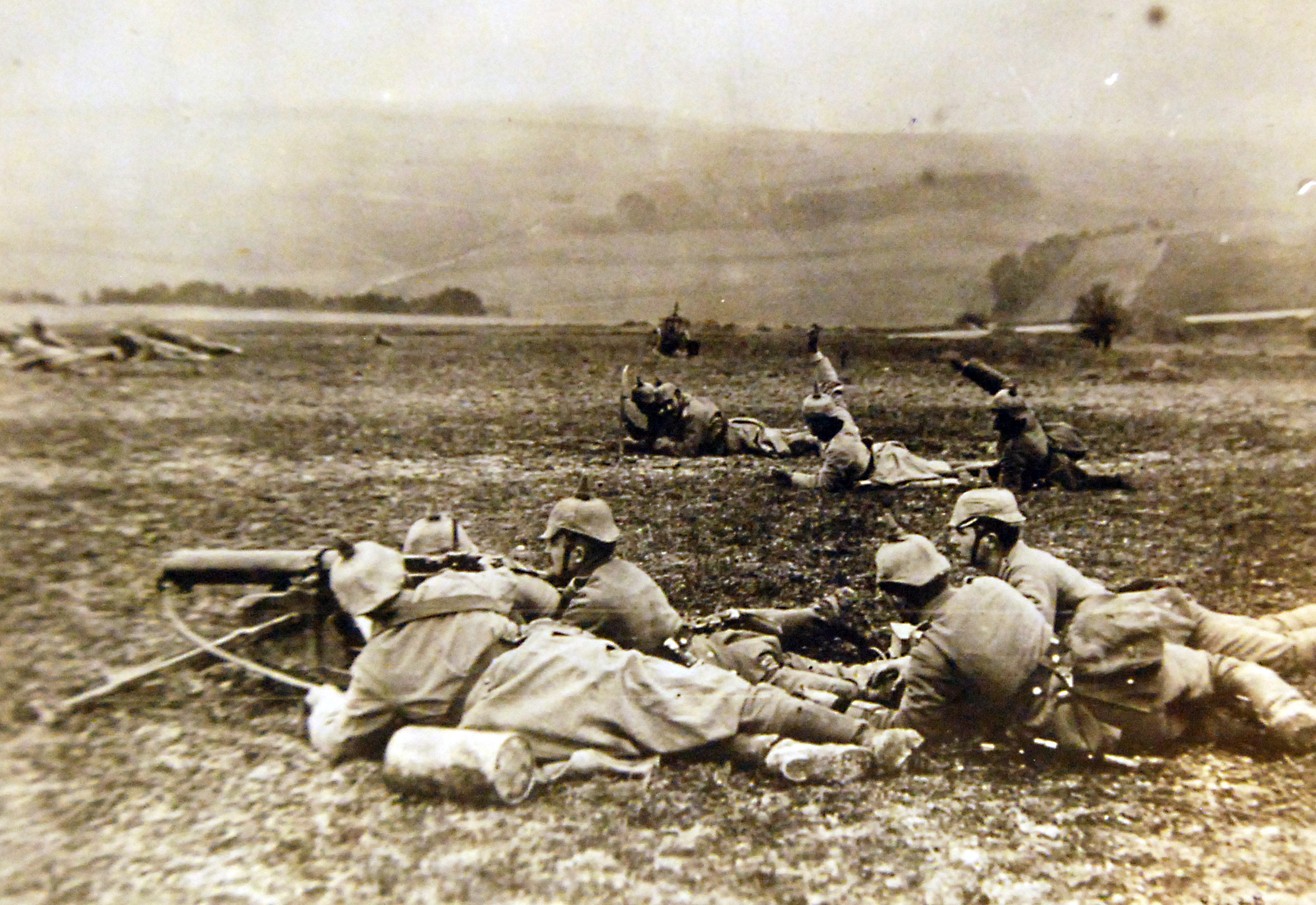
German infantry and machine gun units advancing during World War I

In the 19th century, the invention of the breech-loading rifled musket meant longer range, greater accuracy, and faster rate of fire. Marching ranks of men straight into a barrage of fire from such weapons would cause tremendous rates of casualties, so a new strategy was developed.

Second generation warfare still maintained lines of battle but focused more on the use of technology to allow smaller units of men to maneuver separately. These smaller units allowed for faster advances, less concentrated casualties, and the ability to use cover and concealment to advantage. To some degree, these concepts have remained in use even as the next generations have arisen, so the end of the second generation is not as clearly defined as that of the first. The development of the blitzkrieg highlighted some of the flaws of static firing positions and slow-moving infantry, so this can be considered the beginning of the end for the second generation, at least as the dominant force in military strategy.

The contributions of the second generation were responses to technological development. The second generation saw the rise of trench warfare, artillery support, more advanced reconnaissance techniques, extensive use of camouflage uniforms, radio communications, and fireteam maneuvers.

=== Examples ===
- American Civil War
- Boer War
- Eritrean–Ethiopian War
- First Indochina War
- Franco-Prussian War
- Iran–Iraq War
- Italo-Turkish War
- Russo-Japanese War
- Sino-Vietnamese War
- Spanish Civil War
- Winter War
- World War I

== Third generation ==
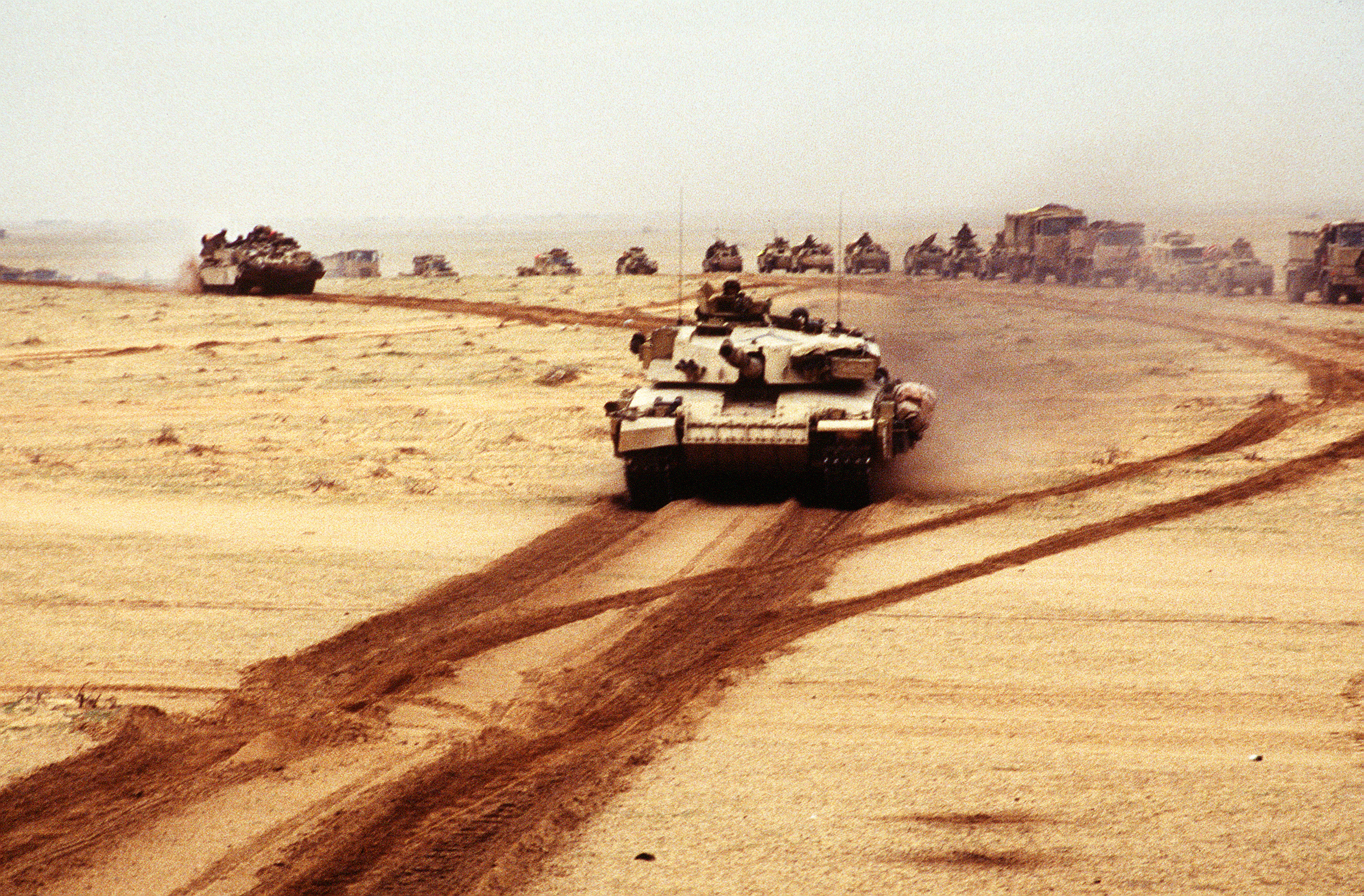
Tanks advancing alongside armored vehicles and mechanized forces during the Gulf War

The use of blitzkrieg during the German invasion of France first demonstrated the power of speed and maneuverability over static artillery positions and trench defenses. Through the use of tanks, mechanized infantry, and close air support, the Germans were able to quickly break through linear defenses and capture the rear.

The emphasis on maneuvering and speed to bypass enemy engagement remains a common strategy throughout the world, and collapsing an enemy's defenses by striking at deeper targets is—in a somewhat different way—a major strategy in fourth generation warfare.

The contributions of the third generation were based on the concept of overcoming technological disadvantage through the use of clever strategy. As linear fighting came to an end, new ways of moving faster began to appear.

The emphasis on mobility moved from heavy armor to greater speed, the development of the helicopter allowed insertions in hostile territory. Advanced missile and loitering munition technology allowed forces to bypass enemy defenses and strike at targets from great distances. The speed and lethality inherent in these methods necessitated a greater degree of independence allowed to the units on the front lines.

Greater trust autonomy needed to be placed in NCOs and junior officers commanding sub-units by higher-ranking officers—a belief that they could adequately achieve their objectives, even with a decapitated chain of command, and without micromanagement from higher ranking commanders in command headquarters.

Smaller fireteam units were allowed greater decision flexibility to deal with rapidly changing situations on the ground, rather than have decisions made for them by commanders who were distant from the front. This began to break down the regimented culture of order that was so important in previous theoretical eras of military command and control.

=== Examples ===
- World War II
- Korean War
- Vietnam War
- Persian Gulf War
- War in Afghanistan
- Iraq War

== Fourth generation ==
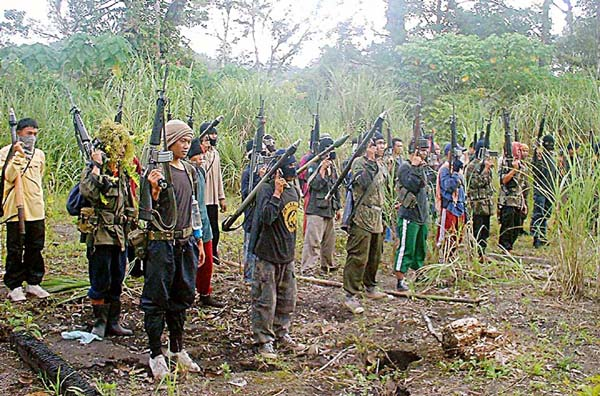
Guerillas in the Philippines in 1999

The term "fourth-generation warfare" was first used in 1989 by a team of American analysts, including William S. Lind, to describe warfare's return to a decentralized form. In terms of generational modern warfare, the fourth generation signifies the nation states' loss of their near-monopoly on combat forces, returning to modes of conflict common in pre-modern times.

The simplest definition includes any war in which one of the major participants is not a state but rather a violent non-state actor. Classical examples, such as the slave uprising under Spartacus or the mercenary uprising that occurred in Carthage after the First Punic War, predate the modern concept of warfare and are examples of this type of conflict.

Fourth generation warfare is defined as conflicts which involve the following elements:

- Are complex and long term
- Terrorism (tactic)
- A non-national or transnational base – highly decentralized
- A direct attack on the enemy's core ideals
- Highly sophisticated psychological warfare, especially through media manipulation and lawfare
- All available pressures are used – political, economic, social and military
- Occurs in low intensity conflict, involving actors from all networks
- Non-combatants are tactical dilemmas
- Lack of hierarchy
- Small in size, spread out network of communication and financial support
- Use of insurgency and guerrilla tactics

Fourth-generation warfare theory has been criticized on the grounds that it is "nothing more than repackaging of the traditional clash between the non-state insurgent and the soldiers of a nation-state."

=== Examples ===
- Algerian War
- Allied Democratic Forces insurgency
- Boko Haram insurgency
- Chiapas conflict
- Colombian conflict
- Insurgency in Ecuador
- Insurgency in Paraguay
- Internal conflict in Peru
- Israeli–Palestinian conflict
- Kurdistan Workers' Party insurgency
- Lord's Resistance Army insurgency
- Malayan Emergency
- Myanmar conflict
- Naxalite–Maoist insurgency
- Nepalese Civil War
- New People's Army rebellion
- Portuguese Colonial War
- Rhodesian Bush War
- Second Congo War
- Sri Lankan civil war
- The Troubles
- War against the Islamic State

== Fifth generation ==
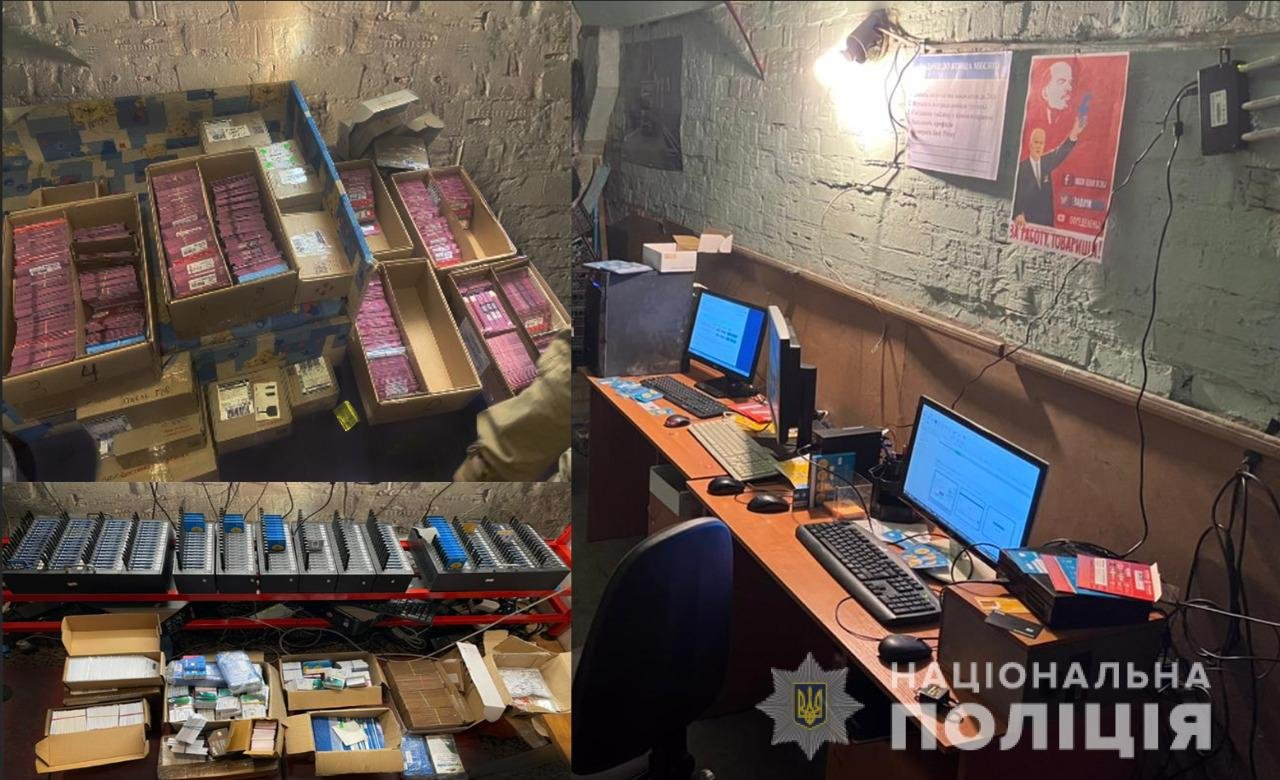
An office belonging to Russian web brigades captured by Ukrainian forces during the 2022 Russian invasion of Ukraine

Fifth-generation warfare is warfare that is conducted primarily through non-kinetic military action, such as social engineering, misinformation, cyberattacks, along with emerging technologies such as artificial intelligence and fully autonomous systems. Fifth generation warfare has been described by Daniel Abbot as a war of "information and perception".

There is no widely agreed upon definition of fifth-generation warfare, and it has been rejected by some scholars, including William S. Lind, who was one of the original theorists of fourth-generation warfare.

The term 'fifth-generation warfare' was first used in 2003 by Robert Steele. The following year, Lind criticised the concept, arguing that the fourth generation had yet to fully materialize.

In 2008, the term was used by Terry Terriff, who presented the 2003 ricin letters as a potential example, but stated that he was not entirely sure if it was a fifth-generation attack, claiming "we may not recognize it as it resolves around us. Or we might look at several alternative futures and see each as fifth generation." Terriff argued that while fifth-generation warfare allows "super-empowered individuals" to make political statements through terrorism, they lack the political power to actually have their demands met.

L.C. Rees described the nature of fifth generation warfare as difficult to define in itself, alluding to the third law of science fiction author Arthur C. Clarke – "any sufficiently advanced technology is indistinguishable from magic."

Alex P. Schmid said that fifth-generation warfare is typified by its "omnipresent battlefield", and the fact that people engaged in it do not necessarily use military force, instead employing a mixture of kinetic and non-kinetic force. In the 1999 book Unrestricted Warfare by colonels Qiao Liang and Wang Xiangsui of the People's Liberation Army, they noted that in the years since the 1991 Gulf War, conventional military violence had decreased, which correlated to an increase in "“political, economic, and technological violence”, which they argued could be more devastating than a conventional war. On the contrary, Thomas P. M. Barnett, believes that the effectiveness of fifth-generational warfare is exaggerated, as terrorism conducted by individuals, such as Timothy McVeigh or Ted Kaczynski, lacks the support of more organized movements. This was seconded by George Michael, who noted that in the United States, gang violence was responsible for far more deaths than lone wolf terrorist attacks.

=== Examples ===
- Mass media use by the Islamic State, including global recruitment as well as attempts to inspire supporters to act independently.
- Russian information war against Ukraine, particularly disinformation in the Russian invasion of Ukraine in the context of the Russo-Ukrainian War.
