= Winning hearts and minds =

Conflict strategy in which one side persuades supporters of the other to their cause

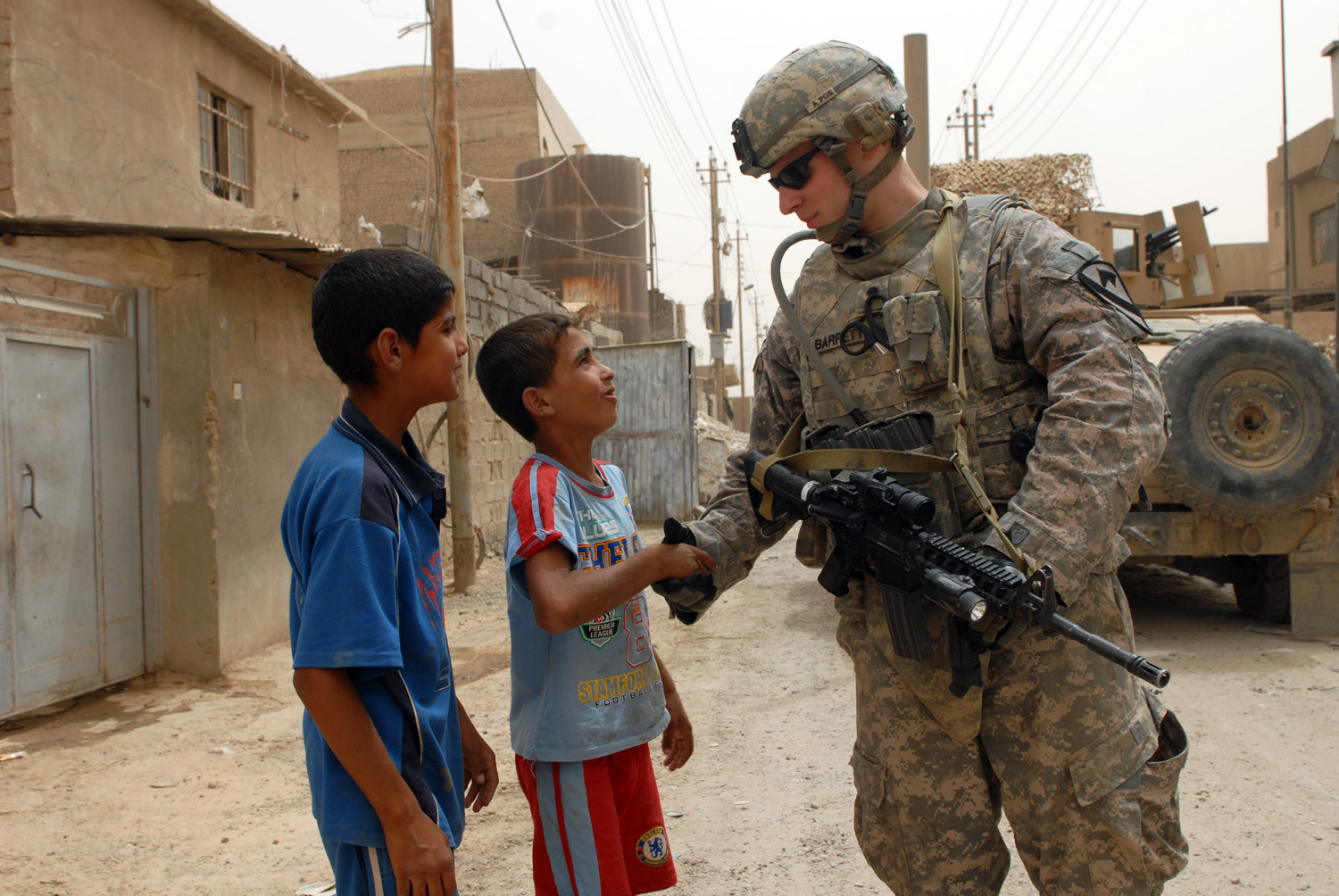
A United States Army soldier greeting Iraqi children while on patrol during the occupation of Iraq in 2009

Winning hearts and minds is a concept occasionally expressed in the resolution of war, insurgency, and other conflicts, in which one side seeks to prevail not by the use of superior force, but by making emotional or intellectual appeals to sway supporters of the other side.

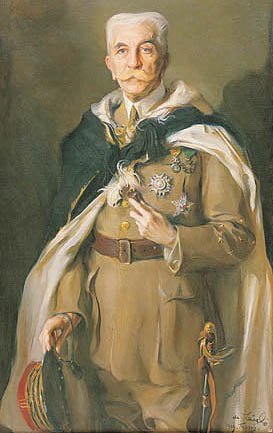
The term "hearts and minds" was first used by French general Hubert Lyautey.

The use of the term "hearts and minds" to reference a method of bringing a subjugated population on side, was first used by French general and colonial administrator Hubert Lyautey as part of his strategy to counter the Black Flags rebellion during the Tonkin campaign in 1895. The term has also been attributed to Gerald Templer's strategy during the Malayan Emergency.

The efficacy of "hearts and minds" as a counterinsurgency strategy has been debated.

== Usage ==
=== United Kingdom ===
The term was used during the Malayan Emergency by the British who employed practices to keep the Malayans' trust and reduce a tendency to side with the Malayan National Liberation Army (MNLA), in this case, by giving medical and food aid to the Malays and indigenous tribes. Gerald Templer stated shortly after his arrival in Malaya that:

The shooting side of this business is only twenty-five percent of the trouble. The other seventy-five percent is getting the people of this country behind us. The answer lies not in pouring more troops into the jungle but in the hearts and minds of the people.

A criticism levied against the British "hearts and minds" concept was that "[t]here is much talk of fighting for "the hearts and minds" of Malayans, but only blind obedience is demanded of them".

In the early 1990s, historians challenged the notion that the British relied on hearts and minds counterinsurgency strategies; they argued that the existing literature minimized or obscured the extent to which the British used force. Other scholars, such as David French, Ashley Jackson, Hew Strachan, Paul Dixon, Alex Marshall, Brendon Piers and Caroline Elkins, have subsequently echoed Newsinger's arguments. Historian David French writes,

The notion that the British conducted their post-war counter-insurgency campaigns by employing kindness, and by trying to secure the ‘hearts and minds’ of the civilians among whom the security forces were operating, has gained wide currency in the literature. It has done so because it supported a Whiggish view of decolonisation that portrayed the way in which the British left their empire as having been an orderly and dignified process of planned withdrawal. But it is misleading. It rested upon a highly selective range of sources, the accounts of senior officers and officials who were intent on sanitising the experience of fighting wars of decolonisation. It failed to take account of the many and varied forms of coercion that the British employed. The foundations of British counter-insurgency doctrine and practice were coercion not kindness.

According to historian Caroline Elkins, the British systematically hid evidence of their violent counterinsurgency campaigns. The archival evidence she uncovered in Kenya became key evidence in lawsuits filed against the British government in the late 2000s and 2010s.

=== Russia ===
According to an assessment by University of Michigan political scientist Yuri Zhukov, Russia has responded to insurgent movements and large-scale insurrections since the Bolshevik Revolution of 1917 with a counterinsurgency model diametrically opposed to the "hearts and minds" approach. Zhukov concluded that "Despite serious setbacks in Afghanistan and the first Chechen War, Russia has one of the most successful track records of any modern counterinsurgent."

=== United States ===
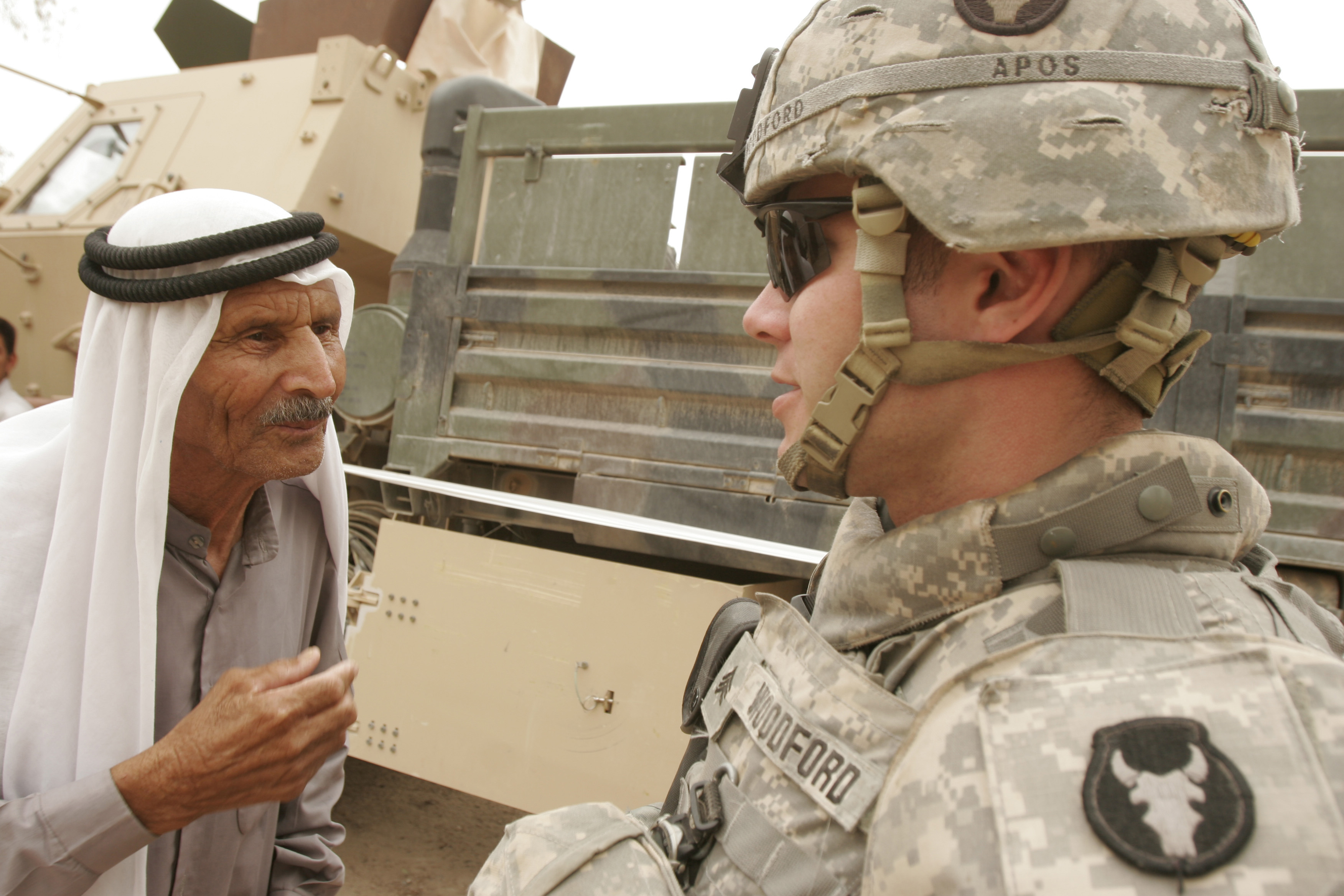
A United States Army soldier speaking with an Iraqi local during a medical engagement event in 2007

American use of the phrase is most likely based on a quote of John Adams, the American Revolutionary War patriot and second president of the United States, who wrote in a letter dated 13 February 1818: "The Revolution was effected before the War commenced. The Revolution was in the minds and hearts of the people; a change in the religious sentiments of their duties and obligations…. This radical change in the principles, opinions, sentiments, and affections of the people, was the real American Revolution."

During the Vietnam War, the United States engaged in a "Hearts and Minds" campaign. The program was inspired by U.S. President Lyndon B. Johnson. One of his most well-known uses of the phrase was from the speech "Remarks at a Dinner Meeting of the Texas Electric Cooperatives, Inc." on 4 May 1965. On that evening, he said, "So we must be ready to fight in Viet-Nam, but the ultimate victory will depend upon the hearts and the minds of the people who actually live out there. By helping to bring them hope and electricity you are also striking a very important blow for the cause of freedom throughout the world."

A similar "Hearts and Minds" campaign was carried out during the 2003 invasion and occupation of Iraq. The operation to "win Iraqi hearts and minds", had been established before the war started. One Central Command planner noted that psychological operations (PSYOPs) were slated to play "a crucial role ... to any conflict in Iraq and to the war on terrorism". Senior US military leaders placed such an importance on the operation that they reworked the way in which the related PSYOPs were carried out, often citing the failures during Operation Enduring Freedom, where it took as long as two days to get PSYOPs through the approval process.

On June 15, 2004, Christopher Shays (R-CT), Chairman of the Subcommittee on National Security, Emerging Threats, and International Relations held hearings which had the aim of determining "corrective actions that might be undertaken to regain the confidence and cooperation (hearts and minds) of the Iraqi people, improve public diplomacy messages, and help chart the course for future efforts in Iraq." Shays noted, "The United States and its Coalition partners are attempting to win the hearts and minds of the people in Iraq while providing military security and support to economic and political reform programs. But some assumptions made about Iraq proved faulty, and some policy decisions were controversial and created more doubt than confidence in U.S. capabilities and intentions."

The hearing focused upon two main questions: 1. What policy decisions made by the Coalition Provisional Authority contributed to changes in Iraqi confidence and cooperation? and, 2. What steps does the United States need to take to regain the confidence and cooperation of the Iraqi people?

Another way of looking at the concept is reflected in the phrase, "If you've got them by the balls, their hearts and minds will follow".

== See also ==
- Counter-insurgency
- Divide and rule
- Fourth-generation warfare
- Generations of warfare
- Low intensity conflict
- Military operations other than war
- Propaganda
- Shock and awe
