= Modern warfare =

Contemporary warfare as contrasted with previous methods

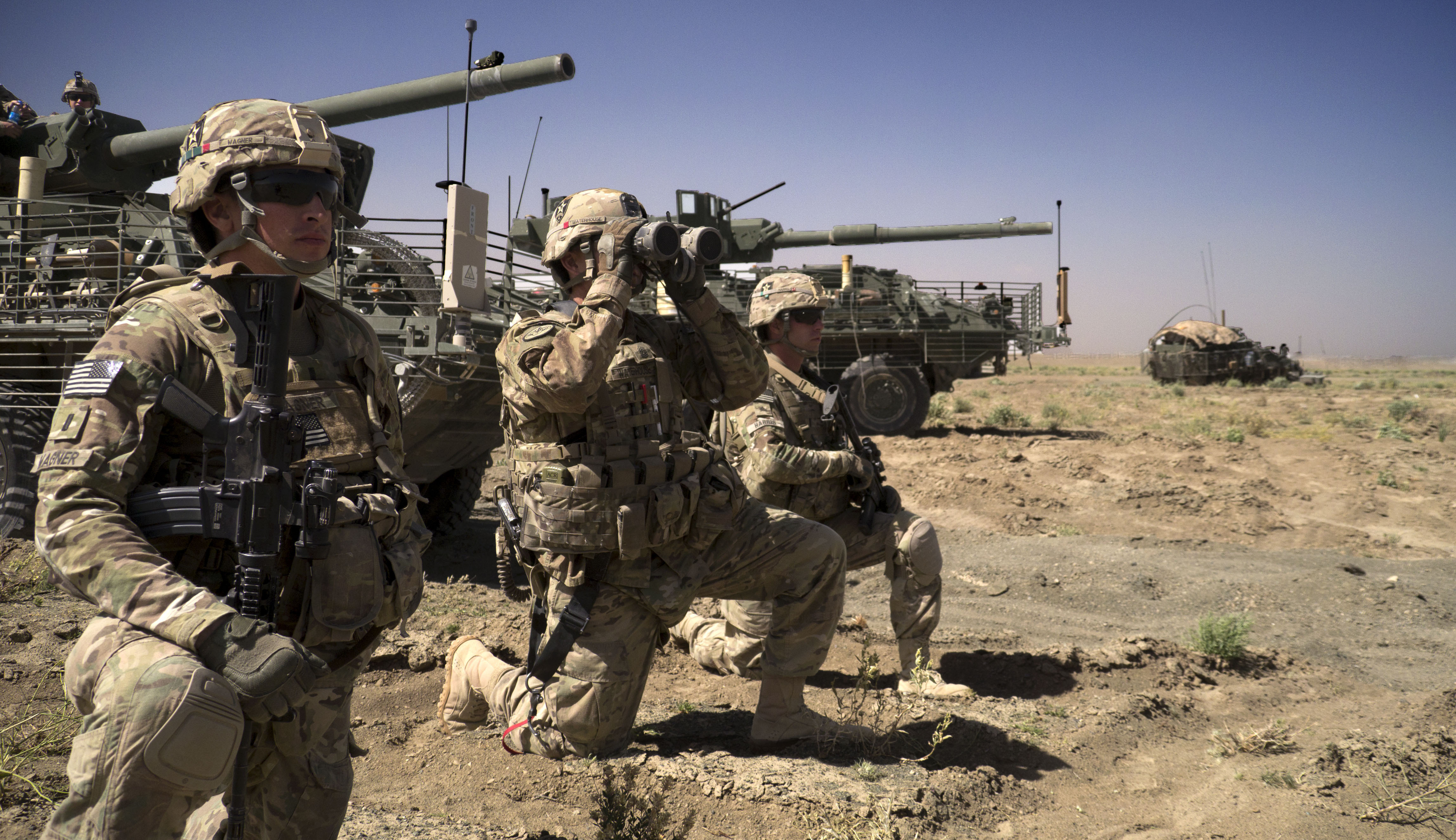
US Army soldiers with M1128 MGS variant Stryker AFVs in a combined arms operation during the War in Afghanistan, May 2013

Modern warfare is warfare that diverges notably from previous military concepts, methods, and technology, emphasizing how combatants must modernize to preserve their battle worthiness. As such, it is an evolving subject, seen differently in different times and places. In its narrowest sense, it is merely a synonym for contemporary warfare.

In its widest sense, it includes all warfare since the "gunpowder revolution" that marks the start of early modern warfare, but other landmark military developments have been used instead, including the emphasis of artillery marked by the Crimean War, the military reliance on railways beginning with the American Civil War, the launch of the first dreadnought in 1905, or the use of the machine gun, aircraft, tank, or radio in World War I.

In another sense, it is tied to changing conventional warfare, including total war, and industrial, mechanized, and electronic warfare. It can describe warfare resulting from the use or threats of weapons of mass destruction, including chemical, biological, radiological, and nuclear warfare. It can describe asymmetric warfare, involving violent non-state actors, guerilla warfare, low-intensity conflict, and counter-insurgency. It can also describe the expansion of warfare to new domains, including space warfare and cyberwarfare, as well as psychological warfare and information warfare.

== Types ==
Some argue that the changing forms of third generation warfare represents nothing more than an evolution of earlier technology.

=== Aerial ===
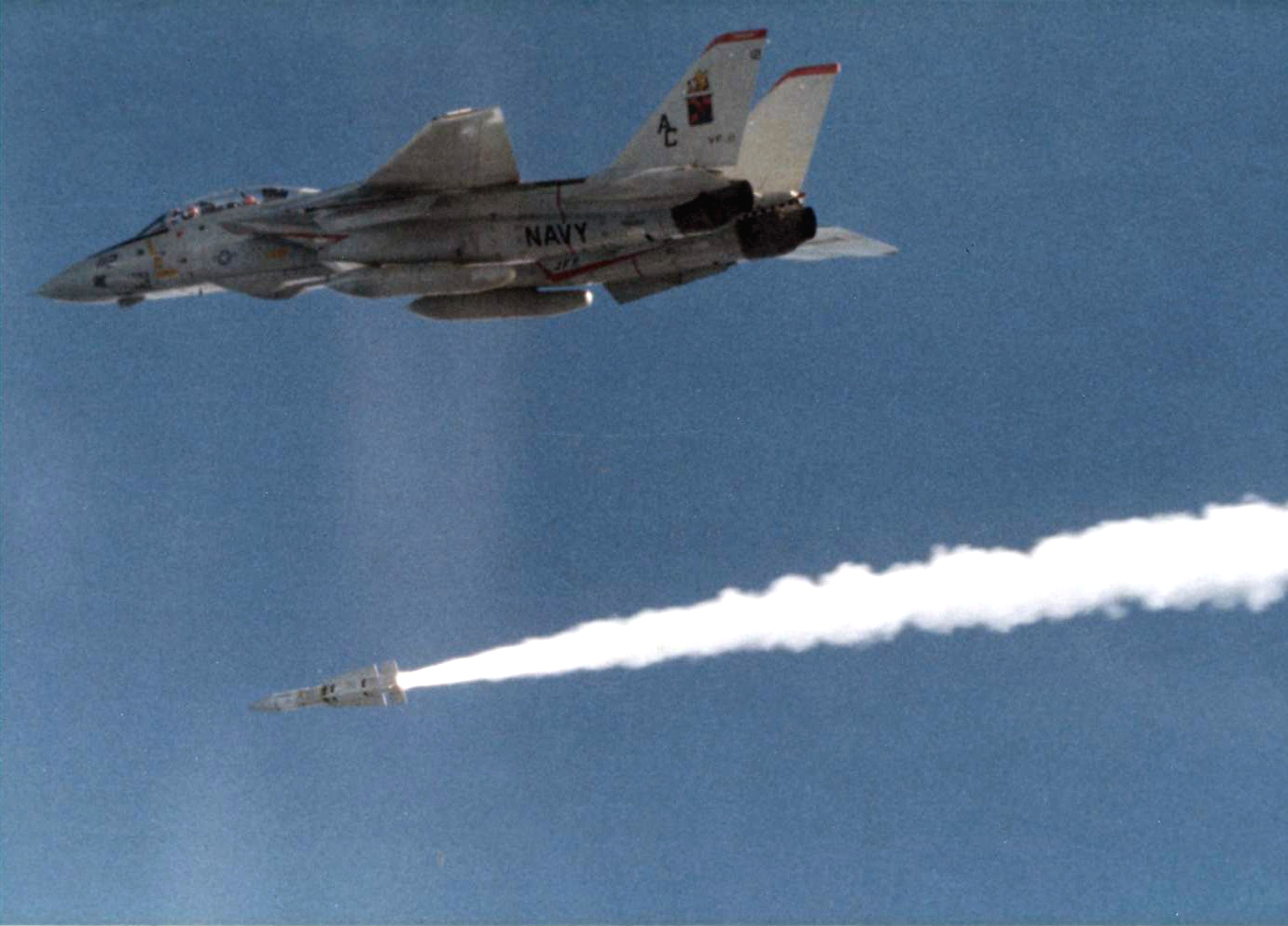
A Grumman F-14 Tomcat fighter aircraft firing an AIM-54 Phoenix air-to-air missile, 1982

Aerial warfare is the use of military aircraft and other flying machines in warfare. Aerial warfare includes bombers attacking enemy concentrations or strategic targets; fighter aircraft battling for control of airspace; attack aircraft engaging in close air support against ground targets; naval aviation flying against sea and nearby land targets; gliders, helicopters and other aircraft to carry airborne forces such as paratroopers; aerial refueling tankers to extend operation time or range; and military transport aircraft to move cargo and personnel.

=== Asymmetric ===
A military situation in which two belligerents of unequal strength interact and take advantage of their respective strengths and weaknesses. This interaction often involves strategies and tactics outside conventional warfare.

=== Biological ===
Biological warfare, also known as germ warfare, is the use of any organism (bacteria, virus or other disease-causing organism) or toxin found in nature, as a weapon of war. It is meant to incapacitate or kill enemy combatants. It may also be defined as the employment of biological agents to produce casualties in man or animals and damage to plants or material; or defense against such employment. Biological warfare involves the intentional release of living pathogens either in their naturally occurring form, for example the diseased corpses of animals, or in the form of specific human-modified organisms.

=== Chemical ===
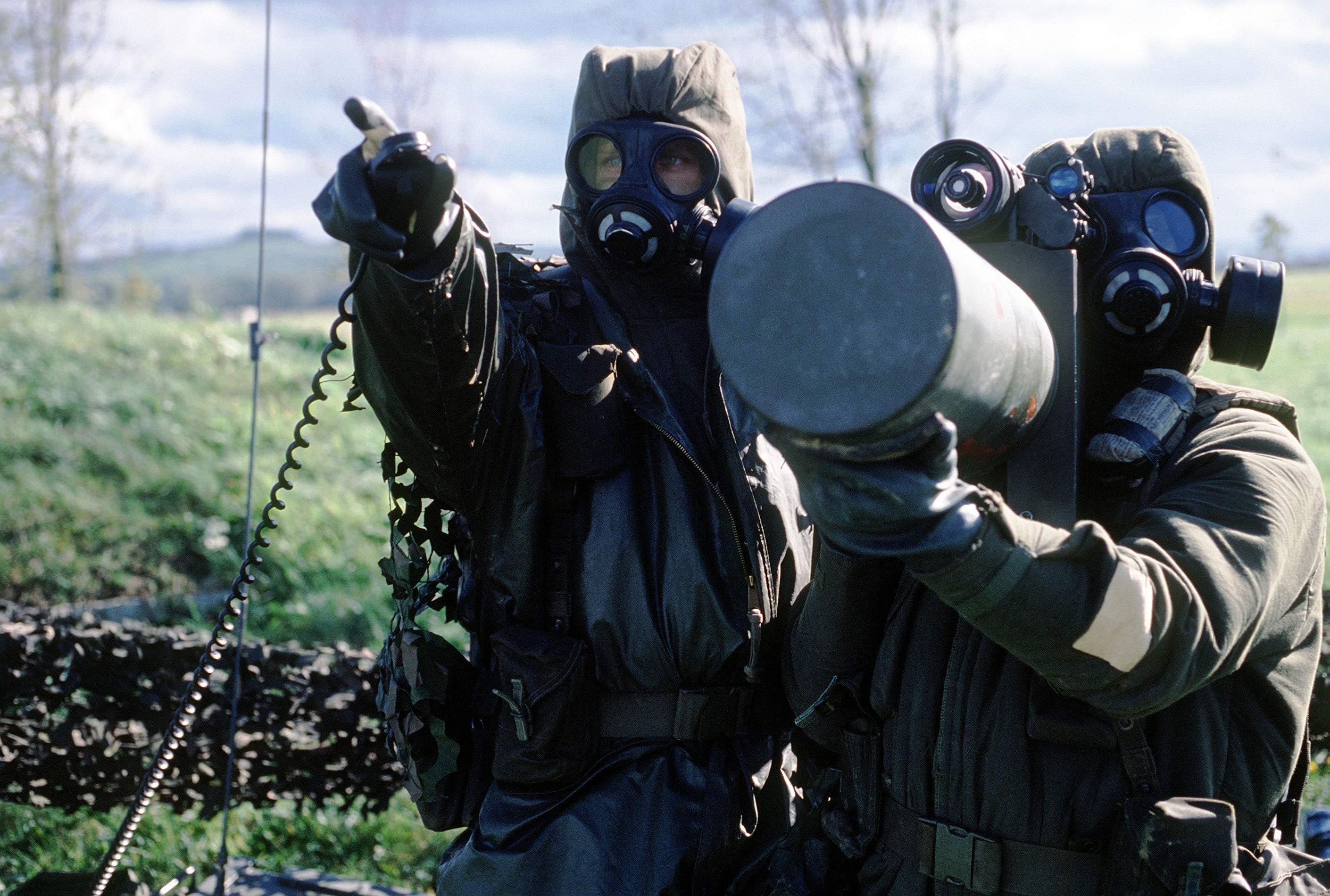
Canadian Army soldiers in CBRN hazmat suits with a Blowpipe man-portable air-defense system, 1987

Chemical warfare is warfare (associated military operations) using the toxic properties of chemical substances to incapacitate or kill enemy combatants. Chemical warfare nerve agents are potent anticholinesterase compounds deliberately formulated to induce debilitating effects or death during wartime hostilities. A key need for both community emergency preparedness, and restoration of military installations where agents have been processed and/or stored, is access to concise and timely information on agent characteristics and treatment, as well as health-based exposure guidelines derived in a clear manner by contemporary methods of data analysis.

=== Electronic ===
Electronic warfare refers to mainly non-violent practices used chiefly to support other areas of warfare. The term was originally coined to encompass the interception and decoding of enemy radio communications, and the communications, technologies, and cryptography methods used to counter such interception, as well as jamming, radio stealth, and other related areas. Over the later years of the 20th century and early years of the 21st century, this has expanded to cover a wide range of areas: the use of, detection of, and avoidance of detection by radar and sonar systems, computer hacking, etc.

=== Decentralized (fourth generation) ===
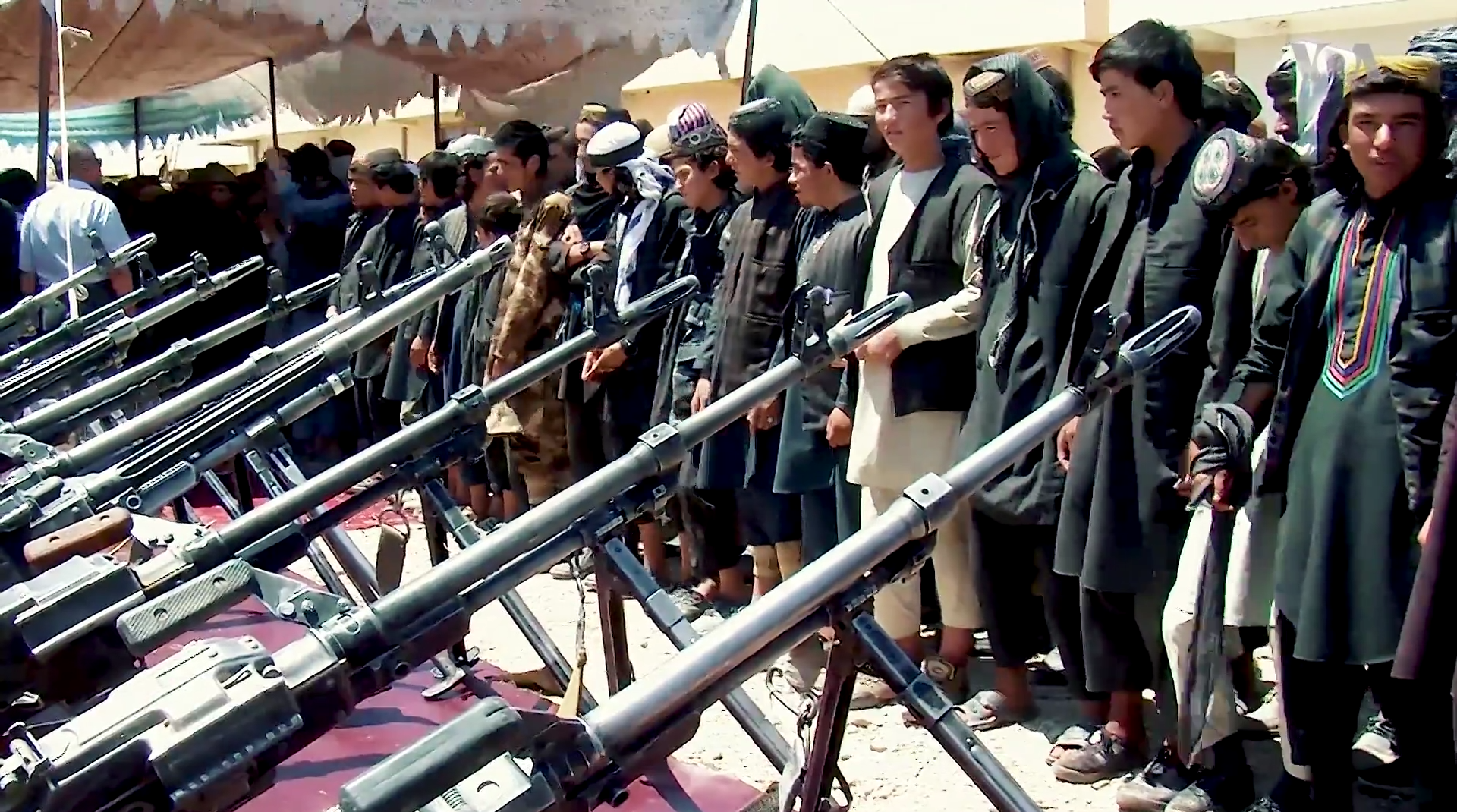
Captured Islamic State fighters in front of their surrendered weaponry, 2018

Fourth generation warfare (4GW) is a concept defined by William S. Lind and expanded by Thomas X. Hammes, used to describe the decentralized nature of modern warfare. The simplest definition includes any war in which one of the major participants is not a state but rather a violent ideological network. Fourth Generation wars are characterized by a blurring of the lines between war and politics, combatants and civilians, conflicts and peace, battlefields and safety.

While this term is similar to terrorism and asymmetric warfare, it is much narrower. Classical insurgencies and the Indian Wars are examples of pre-modern wars, not 4GW. Fourth generation warfare usually has the insurgency group or non-state side trying to implement their own government or reestablish an old government over the one currently running the territory. The blurring of lines between state and non-state is further complicated in a democracy by the power of the media.

=== Ground ===
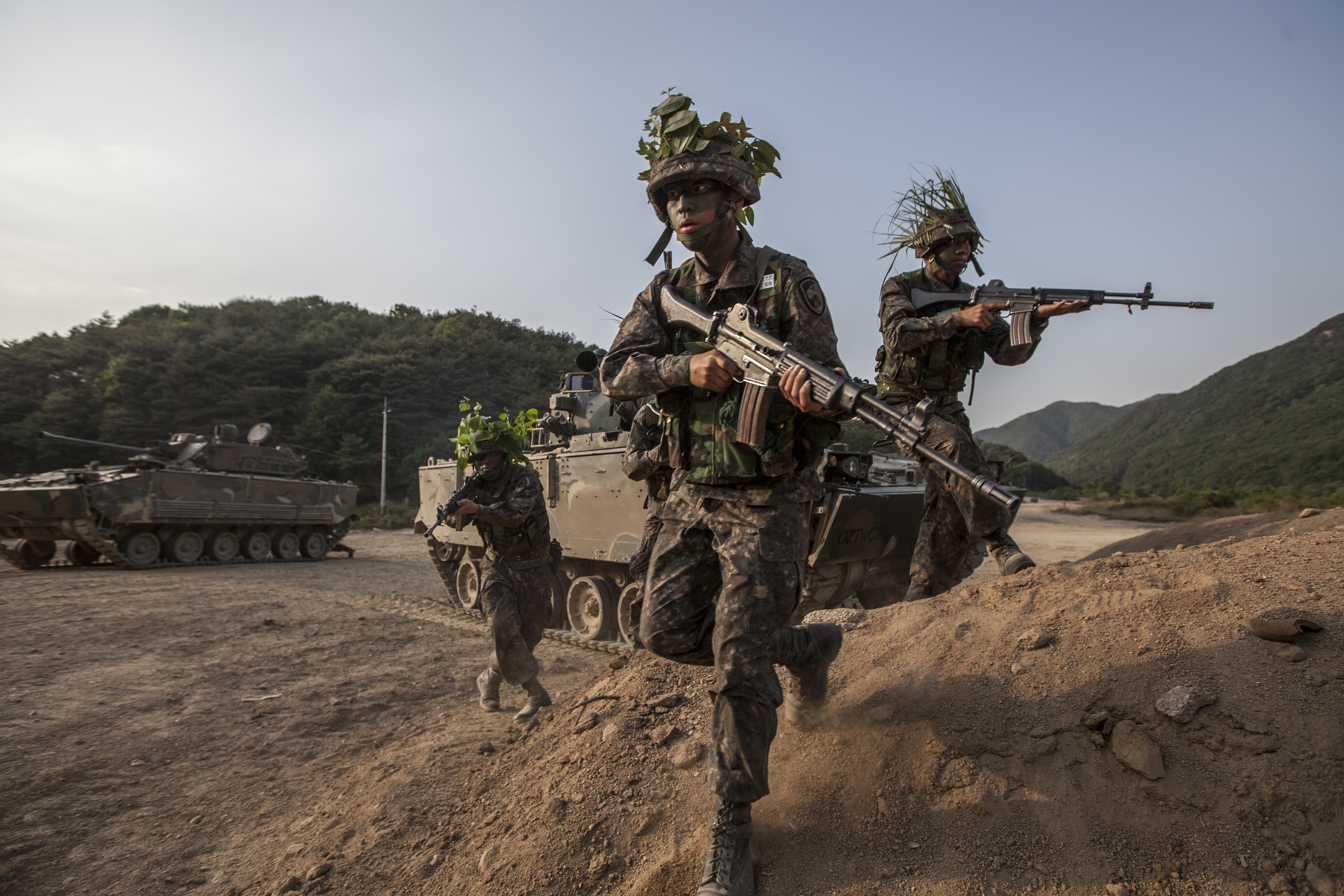
Republic of Korea Army mechanized infantry supported by K21 infantry fighting vehicles, 2014

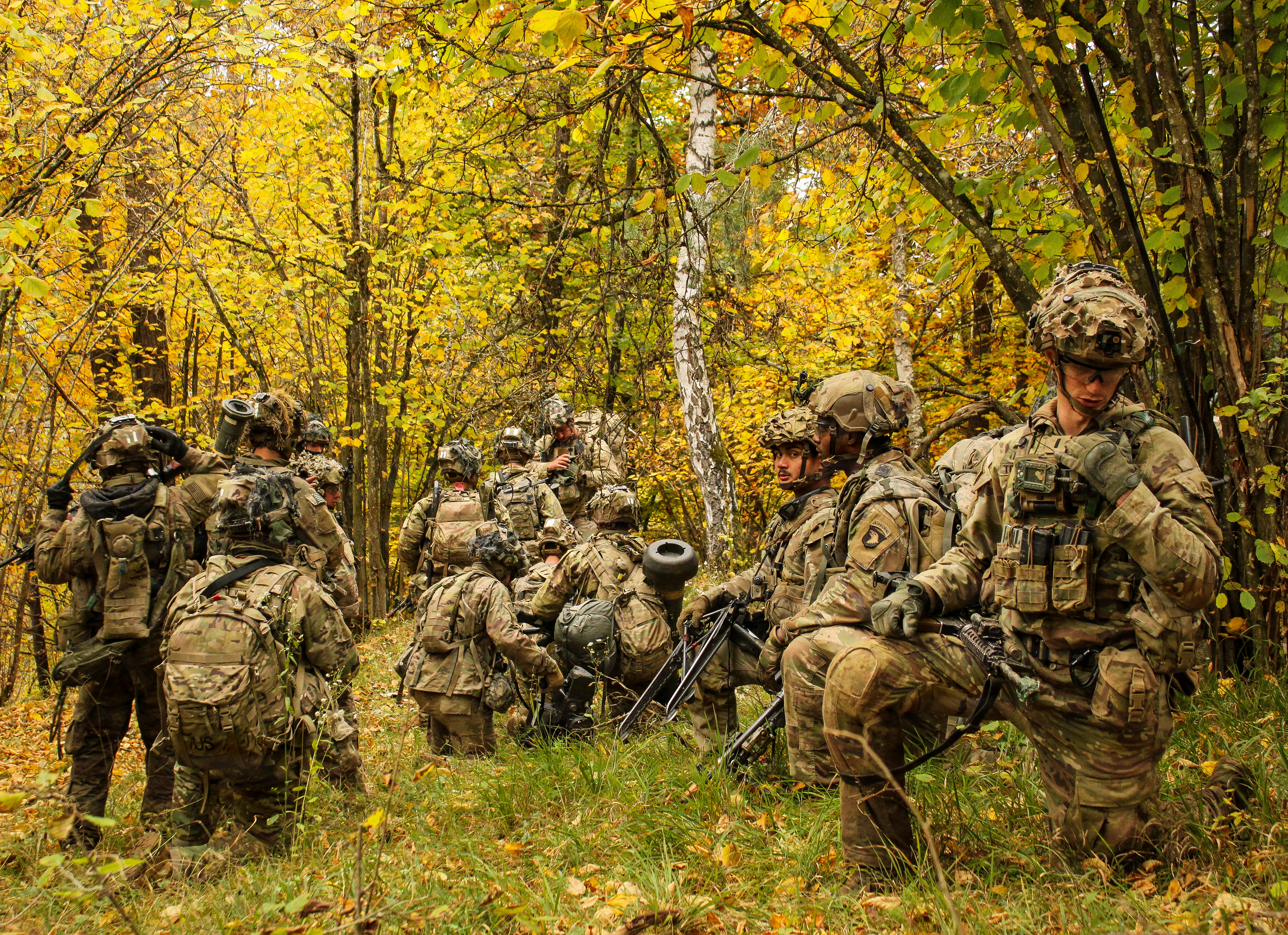
Light infantry from 2nd Brigade, 101st Airborne Division during training in Hohenfels, Germany, October 2025

Ground warfare involves three types of combat units: infantry, armor, and artillery.

Infantry in modern times would consist of mechanized infantry and airborne forces. Usually having a type of rifle or sub-machine gun, an infantryman is the basic unit of an army.

Armored warfare in modern times involves a variety of armored fighting vehicles for the purpose of battle and support. Tanks or other armored vehicles (such as armored personnel carriers or tank destroyers) are slower, yet stronger hunks of metal. They are invulnerable to enemy machine gun fire but prone to rocket infantry, mines, and aircraft so are usually accompanied by infantry. In urban areas, because of smaller space, an armored vehicle is exposed to hidden enemy infantry but as the so-called "Thunder Run" at Baghdad in 2003 showed, armored vehicles can play a critical role in urban combat. In rural areas, an armored vehicle does not have to worry about hidden units though muddy and damp terrain have always been a factor of weakness for tanks and vehicles.

Artillery in contemporary times is distinguished by its large caliber, firing an explosive shell or rocket, and being of such a size and weight as to require a specialized mount for firing and transport. Weapons covered by this term include the howitzer, cannon, mortar, and field gun (collectively called cannon artillery, gun artillery or tube artillery) and rocket artillery. The term "artillery" has traditionally not been used for projectiles with internal guidance systems, even though some artillery units employ surface-to-surface missiles. Recent advances in terminal guidance systems for small munitions has allowed large caliber shells to be fitted with precision guidance fuses, blurring this distinction.

=== Guerrilla ===
Guerrilla warfare is defined as fighting by groups of irregular troops (guerrillas) within areas occupied by the enemy. When guerrillas obey the laws and customs of war, they are entitled, if captured, to be treated as ordinary prisoners of war; however, they are often treated by their captors as unlawful combatants and executed. The tactics of guerrilla warfare stress deception and ambush, as opposed to mass confrontation, and succeed best in an irregular, rugged terrain, and with a sympathetic populace, whom guerrillas often seek to win over or dominate by propaganda and reform. Guerrilla warfare has played a significant role in modern history, especially when waged by Communist liberation movements in Southeast Asia (most notably in the Vietnam War) and elsewhere.

Guerrilla fighters gravitate toward weapons which are easily accessible, low in technology, and low in cost. A typical arsenal of the modern guerrilla would include the AK-47, RPGs, and Improvised explosive devices. The guerrilla doctrines' main disadvantage is the inability to access more advanced equipment due to economic, influence, and accessibility issues. They must rely on small unit tactics involving hit and run. This situation leads to low intensity warfare, asymmetrical warfare, and war amongst the people. The rules of Guerrilla warfare are to fight a little and then to retreat.

=== Intelligence ===
Propaganda

Propaganda is an ancient form of disinformation concerted with sending a set of messages aimed at influencing the opinions or behavior of large numbers of people. Instead of impartially providing information, propaganda in its most basic sense presents information in order to influence its audience. The most effective propaganda is often completely truthful, but some propaganda presents facts selectively to encourage a particular synthesis, or gives loaded messages in order to produce an emotional rather than rational response to the information presented. The desired result is a change of the cognitive narrative of the subject in the target audience.

Psychological

Psychological warfare had its beginnings during the campaigns of Genghis Khan through the allowance of certain civilians of the nations, cities, and villages to flee said place, spreading terror and fear to neighboring principalities. Psychological actions have the primary purpose of influencing the opinions, emotions, attitudes, and behavior of hostile foreign groups in such a way as to support the achievement of national objectives.

Information

Made possible by the widespread use of the electronic media during World War II, Information warfare is a kind of warfare where information and attacks on information and its system are used as a tool of warfare. Some examples of this type of warfare are electronic "sniffers" which disrupt international fund-transfer networks as well as the signals of television and radio stations. Jamming such signals can allow participants in the war to use the stations for a misinformation campaign.

=== Naval ===
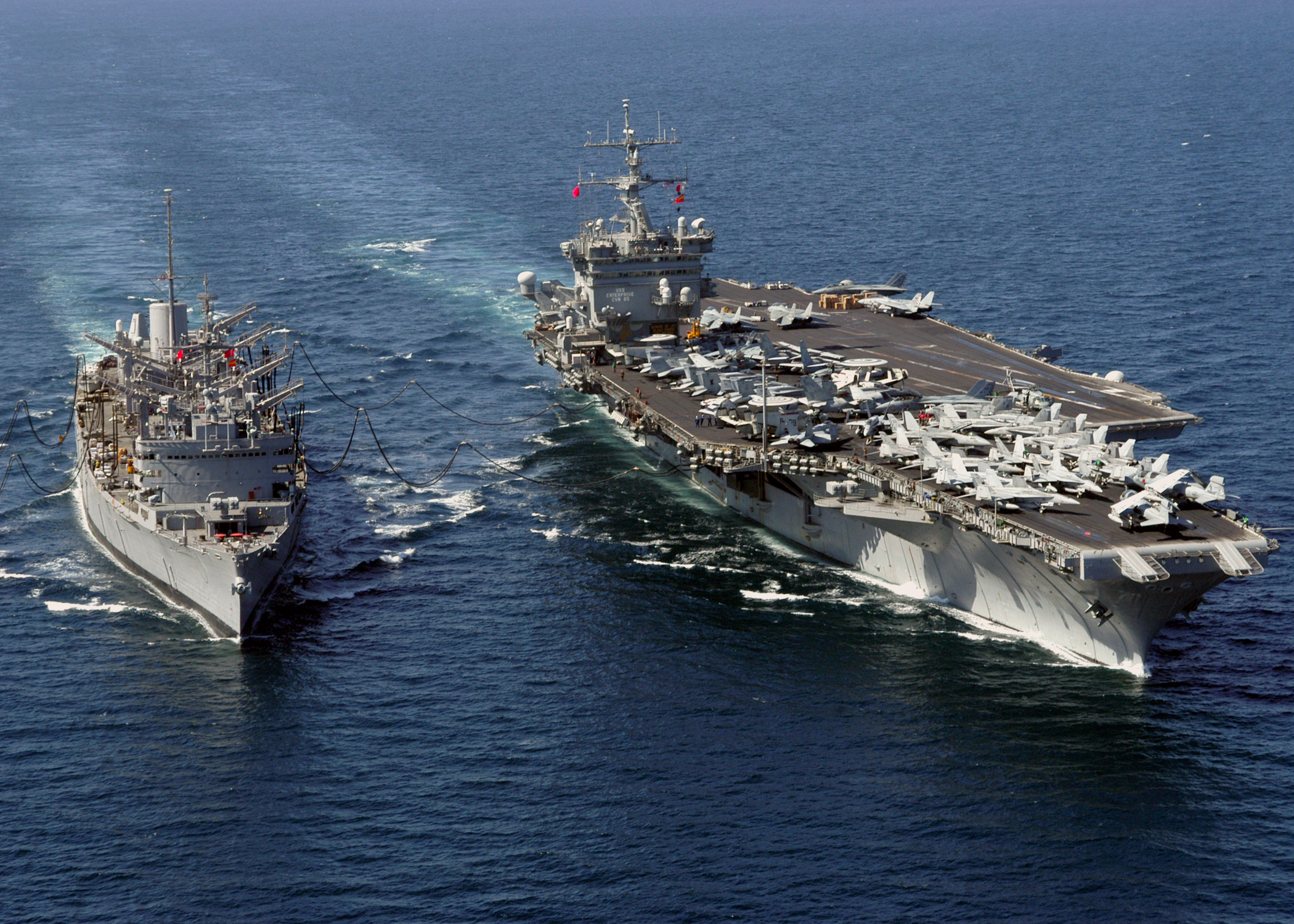
The USS Gettysburg (CG-64) cruiser and USS Enterprise (CVN-65) aircraft carrier of the United States Navy, 2003

Naval warfare takes place on the high seas (blue water navy). Usually, only large, powerful nations have competent blue water or deep water navies. Modern navies primarily use aircraft carriers, submarines, frigates, cruisers, and destroyers for combat. This provides a versatile array of attacks, capable of hitting ground targets, air targets, or other seafaring vessels. Most modern navies also have a large naval aviation contingent, deployed from aircraft carriers. In World War II, small craft (motor torpedo boats variously called PT boats, MTBs, MGBs, Schnellboote, or MAS-boats) fought near shore. This developed in the Vietnam War into riverine warfare (brown water navy), in intertidal and river areas. Irregular warfare makes this sort of combat more likely in the future.

=== Network-centric ===
Network-centric warfare is essentially a new military doctrine made possible by the Information Age. Weapons platforms, sensors, and command and control centers are being connected through high-speed communication networks. The doctrine is related to the Revolution in Military Affairs debate.

The overall network which enables this strategy in the United States military is called the Global Information Grid.

=== New generation ===
New generation warfare is a Russian military theory of unconventional warfare based on the Gerasimov doctrine which prioritizes the psychological and people-centered aspects over traditional military concerns, and emphasizes a phased approach of non-military influence such that armed conflict, if it arises, is much less costly in human or economic terms.

=== Nuclear ===
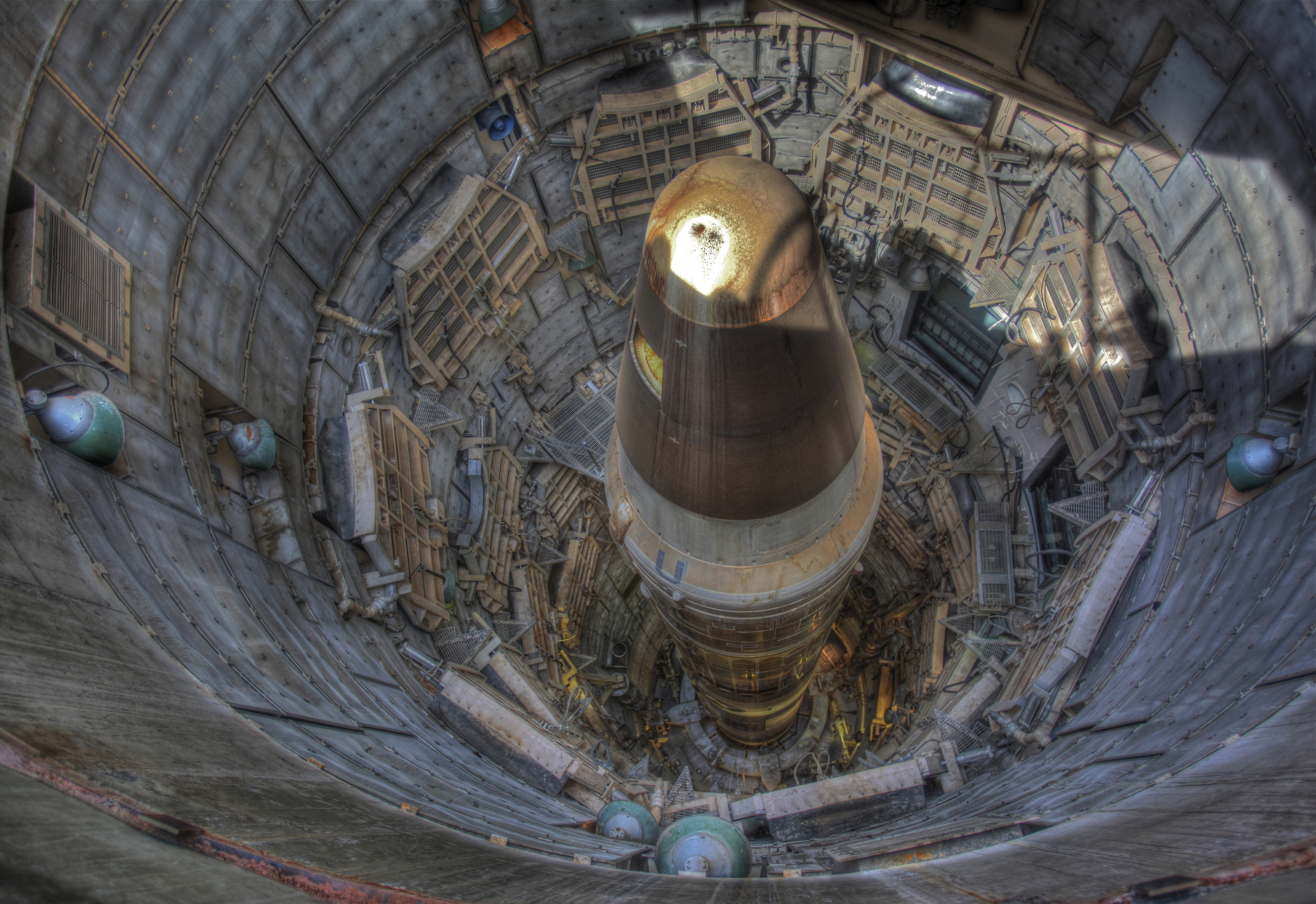
The interior of a LGM-25C Titan II intercontinental ballistic missile launch facility in Arizona, United States, 2012

Nuclear war is a type of warfare which relies on nuclear weapons. There are two types of warfare in this category. In a limited nuclear war, a small number of weapons are used in a tactical exchange aimed primarily at enemy combatants. In a full-scale nuclear war, large numbers of weapons are used in an attack aimed at entire countries. This type of warfare would target both combatants and non-combatants.

=== Space ===
Space warfare is the hypothetical warfare that occurs outside the Earth's atmosphere. As of 2026, no wars have been fought here yet. The weapons would include orbital weaponry and space weapons. High value outer space targets would include satellites, military satellites and weapon platforms. Notably no real weapons exist in space yet, though ground-to-space missiles have been successfully tested against target satellites. As of now, this is purely science fiction.

== Modern wars ==
=== Lists ===
- List of wars: 1800–1899
- List of wars: 1900–1944
- List of wars: 1945–1989
- List of wars: 1990–2002
- List of wars: 2003–2019
- List of wars: 2020–present
- List of ongoing armed conflicts
- List of modern conflicts in the Middle East

=== Major modern wars ===
- 1803 – Napoleonic Wars
- 1808 – Spanish American wars of independence
- 1839 – Opium Wars
- 1846 – Mexican–American War
- 1853 – Crimean War
- 1854 – Taiping Rebellion
- 1861 – American Civil War
- 1862 – Dungan Revolt (1862–1877)
- 1864 – Paraguayan War
- 1870 – Franco-Prussian War
- 1877 – Russo-Turkish War
- 1879 – Anglo-Zulu War
- 1879 – War of the Pacific
- 1881 – Mahdist War
- 1898 – Spanish–American War
- 1899 – Second Boer War
- 1899 – Boxer Rebellion
- 1904 – Russo-Japanese War
- 1910 – Mexican Revolution
- 1911 – Italo-Turkish War
- 1912 – Balkan Wars
- 1914 – World War I
- 1917 – Russian Civil War
- 1919 – Turkish War of Independence
- 1927 – Chinese Civil War
- 1932 – Colombia–Peru War
- 1935 – Second Italo-Ethiopian War
- 1936 – Spanish Civil War
- 1937 – Second Sino-Japanese War
- 1939 – World War II
- 1945 – Indonesian National Revolution
- 1946 – Greek Civil War
- 1946 – First Indochina War
- 1948 – Myanmar conflict
- 1948 – 1948 Arab–Israeli War
- 1948 – Malayan Emergency
- 1950 – Korean War
- 1952 – Mau Mau rebellion
- 1953 – Cuban Revolution
- 1955 – First Sudanese Civil War
- 1955 – Vietnam War
- 1956 – Suez Crisis
- 1960 – Congo Crisis
- 1961 – Nicaraguan Revolution
- 1961 – Portuguese Colonial War
- 1962 – Sino-Indian War
- 1964 – Colombian conflict
- 1964 – Rhodesian Bush War
- 1965 – Indo-Pakistani war of 1965
- 1967 – Six-Day War
- 1967 – Nigerian Civil War
- 1971 – Indo-Pakistani war of 1971
- 1973 – Yom Kippur War
- 1974 – Ethiopian Civil War
- 1975 – Angolan Civil War
- 1975 – Lebanese Civil War
- 1977 – Ogaden War
- 1978 – Cambodian-Vietnamese War
- 1979 – Sino-Vietnamese War
- 1979 – Soviet–Afghan War
- 1980 – Iran–Iraq War
- 1982 – Falklands War
- 1983 – Second Sudanese Civil War
- 1983 – Sri Lankan Civil War
- 1986 – Toyota War
- 1988 – First Nagorno-Karabakh War
- 1990 – Gulf War
- 1991 – Somali Civil War
- 1992 – Bosnian War
- 1996 – First Congo War
- 1998 – Second Congo War
- 1998 – Kosovo War
- 1999 – Kargil War
- 2001 – War in Afghanistan
- 2003 – War in Darfur
- 2003 – Iraq War
- 2011 – First Libyan Civil War
- 2011 – Syrian Civil War
- 2012 – War in the Sahel
- 2014 – Iraqi Civil War
- 2014 – War in Donbas
- 2014 – Yemeni Civil War
- 2020 – Second Nagorno-Karabakh War
- 2020 – Tigray War
- 2022 – Russo-Ukrainian war (2022–present)
- 2023 – Sudanese civil war (2023–present)
- 2023 – Gaza war
- 2025 – Iran–Israel war
- 2026 – Iran war
