= Stealth War =

2019 non-fiction book by Robert Spalding

Stealth War: How China Took Over While America's Elite Slept
- Author: Robert Spalding
- Language: English
- Subject: Chinese Communist Party; China–US relations; political warfare; Chinese information operations and information warfare
- Publisher: Portfolio
- Publication date: 1 October 2019
- Publication place: United States
- Pages: 256
- ISBN: 978-0-593-08435-9 (paperback)

Stealth War: How China Took Over While America's Elite Slept is a 2019 book by Robert Spalding about the United States' foreign relations with the People's Republic of China (PRC), the influence of the PRC in the United States, and the nature of the geo-political rivalry between the two countries. Spalding argues that the PRC is the greatest rival of the United States, why the country is a rival, strategies the PRC is using to undermine the United States, and policies the United States could implement to counter that rivalry. He also argues that the PRC has been conducting a covert aggressive campaign to undermine and eventually usurp American power since the 1990s. This includes a campaign against American values globally as enshrined in the Atlantic Charter such as support for democratic forms of government and human rights.

Spalding cites Unrestricted Warfare (1999) by then PRC colonels Qiao Liang (乔良) and Wang Xiangsui (王湘穗) as both evidence of and an outline for the PRC's long-term plan to undermine American power. He states that a critical part of the PRC's strategy has been to undermine the democratic institutions within the United States. The book outlines, and gives examples of, a number of American grievances with PRC policies such as:

- Intellectual property theft
- Chinese Communist Party infiltration of domestic society and institutions
- The erosion of domestic political and economic institutions
- Unfair and unequal trade practices
- Chinese espionage in the United States
- Foreign investment manipulation
- Debt trap diplomacy and the Belt and Road Initiative

Spalding argues that increasingly, with the advent of technologies such as 5G, one's existence within the internet will place one in this conflict regardless of individual choice; a technology conflict that the PRC has developed very strong capabilities in. Spalding states that over the past three decades the PRC has used these practices to expand its military, industrial and technological power whilst the United States has greatly reduced or outsourced its industrial base and lost much of its technological lead.

In 2022, he published War without rules: China's Playbook for Global Domination.

== See also ==
- Claws of the Panda, 2019 book about Chinese government influence in Canada
- Silent Invasion (book), 2018 book about Chinese government influence in Australia
- Hidden Hand (book), a 2020 follow-up to Silent Invasion (2018)
