= Qiao Liang =

Qiao Liang may refer to:

- Qiao Liang (writer) (born 1955), Chinese Air Force Major General and writer
- Liang Chow (born 1968), or Qiao Liang, Chinese-American gymnast and coach
