= Fourth-generation warfare =

Categorization of conflict between nations

Fourth-generation warfare (4GW) is conflict characterized by a blurring of the distinction between war and politics, and of the distinction between combatants and civilians. It is placed as succeeding the third generation in the five-generation model of military theory.

The term was first used in 1980 by a team of United States analysts, including William S. Lind, to describe warfare's return to a decentralized form. In terms of generational modern warfare, the fourth generation signifies the nation states' loss of their near-monopoly on combat forces, returning to modes of conflict common in pre-modern times.

The simplest definition includes any war in which one of the major participants is not a state but rather a non-state opponent. Classical examples of this type of conflict, such as the slave uprising under Spartacus, predate the modern concept of warfare.

== Elements ==
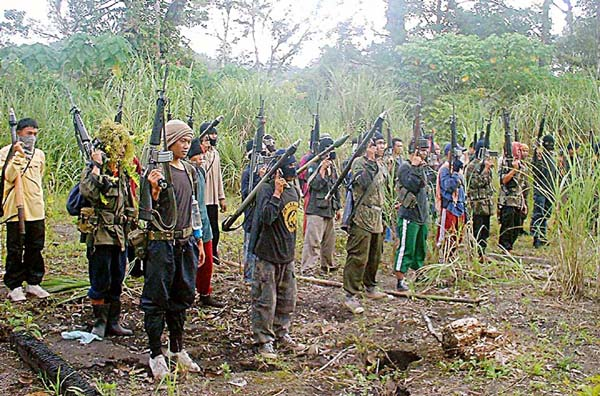
Guerrillas in Maguindanao, 1999

Fourth-generation warfare is defined as conflicts which involve the following elements:

- Complex and long term
- Terrorism (tactic)
- A non-national or transnational base – highly decentralized
- A direct attack on the enemy's culture, including genocidal acts against civilians.
- All available pressures are used – political, economic, social and military
- Occurs in low-intensity conflict, involving actors from all networks
- Non-combatants are tactical dilemmas
- Lack of hierarchy
- Small in size, spread out network of communication and financial support
- Use of insurgency tactics as subversion, terrorism and guerrilla tactics
- Decentralised forces

== History ==
The concept was first described by the authors William S. Lind, Colonel Keith Nightengale (US Army), Captain John F. Schmitt (USMC), Colonel Joseph W. Sutton (US Army), and Lieutenant Colonel Gary I. Wilson (USMCR) in a 1989 Marine Corps Gazette article titled "The Changing Face of War: Into the Fourth Generation". In 2006, the concept was expanded upon by USMC Colonel Thomas X. Hammes (Ret.) in his book, The Sling and The Stone.

The generations of warfare described by these authors are:

- First generation: tactics of line and column; which developed in the age of the smoothbore musket. Lind describes First Generation of warfare as beginning after the Peace of Westphalia in 1648 ending the Thirty Years' War and establishing the state's need to organize and conduct war. 1GW consisted of tightly ordered soldiers with top-down discipline. These troops would fight in close order and advance slowly. This began to change as the battlefield changed. Old line and column tactics are now considered suicidal as the bow and arrow/sword morphed into the rifle and machine gun.
- Second generation: tactics of linear fire and movement, with reliance on indirect fire. This type of warfare can be seen in the early stages of World War I where there was still strict adherence to drill and discipline of formation and uniform. However, there remained a dependence on artillery and firepower to break the stalemate and move towards a pitched battle.
- Third generation: tactics of infiltration to bypass and collapse the enemy's combat forces rather than seeking to close with and destroy them; and defence in depth. The 3GW military seeks to bypass the enemy, and attack his rear forward, such as the tactics used by German Stormtroopers in World War I against the British and French in order to break the trench warfare stalemate (Lind 2004). These aspects of 3GW bleed into 4GW as it is also warfare of speed and initiative. However, it targets both military forces and home populations.

The use of fourth-generation warfare can be traced to the Cold War period, as superpowers and major powers attempted to retain their grip on colonies and captured territories. Unable to withstand direct combat against bombers, tanks, and machine guns, non-state entities used tactics of education/propaganda, movement-building, secrecy, terror, and/or confusion to overcome the technological gap.

Fourth-generation warfare has often involved an insurgent group or other non-state opponents trying to implement their own government or reestablish an old government over the current ruling power. However, a non-state entity tends to be more successful when it does not attempt, at least in the short term, to impose its own rule, but tries simply to disorganize and delegitimize the state in which the warfare takes place. The aim is to force the state adversary to expend manpower and money in an attempt to establish order, ideally in such a highhanded way that it merely increases disorder, until the state surrenders or withdraws.

Fourth-generation warfare is often seen in conflicts involving failed states and civil wars, particularly in conflicts involving non-state opponents, intractable ethnic or religious issues, or gross conventional military disparities. Many of these conflicts occur in the geographic area described by author Thomas P.M. Barnett as the Non-Integrating Gap, fought by countries from the globalised Functioning Core.

Fourth-generation warfare has much in common with traditional low-intensity conflict in its classical forms of insurgency and guerrilla war. As in those small wars, the conflict is initiated by the "weaker" party through actions which can be termed "offensive". The difference lies in the manner in which 4GW opponents adapt those traditional concepts to present day conditions. These conditions are shaped by technology, globalization, religious fundamentalism, and a shift in moral and ethical norms which brings legitimacy to certain issues previously considered restrictions on the conduct of war. This amalgamation and metamorphosis produces novel ways of war for both the entity on the offensive and that on the defensive.

== Characteristics ==
Fourth-generation warfare is normally characterized by a non-state opponent fighting a state. This fighting can be physically done, such as by modern examples Hezbollah or the Liberation Tigers of Tamil Eelam (LTTE). In this realm, the violent non-state actor (VNSA) uses all three levels of fourth generation warfare. These are the physical (actual combat; it is considered the least important), mental (the will to fight, belief in victory, etc.,) and moral (the most important, this includes cultural norms, etc.) levels.

A 4GW enemy has the following characteristics: lack of hierarchical authority, lack of formal structure, patience and flexibility, ability to keep a low profile when needed, and small size. A 4GW adversary might use the tactics of an insurgent, terrorist, or guerrilla in order to wage war against a nation's infrastructure. Fourth generation warfare takes place on all fronts: economical, political, the media, military, and civilian. Conventional military forces often have to adapt tactics to fight a 4GW enemy.

Resistance can also be below the physical level of violence. This is via non-violent means, such as Mahatma Gandhi's opposition to the British Empire or the marches led by Martin Luther King Jr. Both desired their factions to deescalate the conflict while the state escalates against them, the objective being to target the opponent on the moral and mental levels rather than the physical level. The state is then seen as oppressive and loses support.

Another characteristic of fourth-generation warfare is that unlike in third generation warfare, the VNSA's forces are decentralized. With fourth generation warfare, there may even be no single organization and that smaller groups organize into impromptu alliances to target a bigger threat (that being the state armed forces or another faction). As a result, these alliances are weak and if the state's military leadership is smart enough they can split their enemy and cause them to fight amongst themselves.

Fourth-generation warfare goals:

- Survival.
- To convince the enemy's political decision makers that their goals are either unachievable or too costly for the perceived benefit.

Yet, another factor is that political centers of gravity have changed. These centers of gravity may revolve around nationalism, religion, or family or clan honor.

Disaggregated forces, such as guerrillas, terrorists, and rioters, which lack a center of gravity, deny to their enemies a focal point at which to deliver a conflict ending blow. As a result, strategy becomes more problematic while combating a VNSA.

It has been theorized that a state vs. state conflict in fourth-generation warfare would involve the use of computer hackers and international law to obtain the weaker side's objectives, the logic being that the civilians of the stronger state would lose the will to fight as a result of seeing their state engage in alleged atrocities and having their own bank accounts harmed.

Three principal attributes of the new-age terrorism were held to be their hybrid structure (as opposed to the traditional microscopic command and control pattern), importance given to systemic disruption vis-a-vis target destruction, and sophisticated use of technological advancements (including social media and mobile communications technology). A terrorist network could be designed to be either acephalous (headless like Al-Qaeda after Bin Laden) or polycephalous (hydra-headed like Kashmiri separatists). Social media networks supporting the terrorists are characterized by positive feedback loops, tight coupling and non-linear response propagation (viz. a small perturbation causing a large disproportionate response).

== Criticism ==
Fourth-generation warfare theory has been criticized on the grounds that it is "nothing more than repackaging of the traditional clash between the non-state insurgent and the soldiers of a nation-state."

Strategic Studies Institute writer and United States Army War College professor Antulio J. Echevarria II, in his article Fourth-Generation War and Other Myths, argues what is being called fourth generation warfare are simply insurgencies. He also claims that 4GW was "reinvented" by Lind to create the appearance of having predicted the future. Echevarria writes: "The generational model is an ineffective way to depict changes in warfare. Simple displacement rarely takes place, significant developments typically occur in parallel." The critique was rebutted by John Sayen, a military historian and retired Lt. Col. in the Marine Corps Reserve.

Lieutenant General Kenneth F. McKenzie Jr., USMC, characterizes fourth-generation warfare theory as "elegant irrelevance" and states that "its methods are unclear, its facts contentious and open to widely varying interpretations, and its relevance questionable."

Rod Thornton argues that Thomas Hammes and William S. Lind are "providing an analytical lens through which to view the type of opposition that exists now 'out there' and to highlight the shortcomings of the current US military in dealing with that opposition." Instead of fourth generation warfare being an explanation for a new way of warfare, it allows the blending of different generations of warfare with the exception that fourth generation also encompasses new technology. Fourth generation warfare theorists such as Lind and Hammes wish to make the point that it "is not just that the military's structure and equipment are ill-suited to the 4GW problem, but so is its psyche".

== See also ==
- Asymmetric warfare
- CIA's Special Activities Division
- DIA's Defense Clandestine Service
- Civilian casualty ratio
- Counter-insurgency
- Cyberwarfare
- Divide and rule
- Fifth-generation warfare
- Grey-zone (international relations)
- Irregular warfare
- William S. Lind
- Military operations other than war – concept that encompass the use of military capabilities across the range of military operations short of war
- Military strategy – collective name for planning the conduct of warfare
- New generation warfare
- H. John Poole – writer on 4GW topics
- Proxy war – opposing powers using third parties as substitutes for fighting each other directly
- Unrestricted Warfare
- War amongst the people
- War cycles – the theory that wars happen in cycles
- War on drugs
