= Thomas Hammes =

American counter-insurgency theorist (born 1953)

Thomas X. Hammes
- Military career
- Branch: United States Marine Corps
- Rank: Colonel

Colonel Thomas X. Hammes is a retired U.S. Marine officer and counter-insurgency warfare specialist.

== Education ==
He has a Bachelor of Science degree from the United States Naval Academy, a master's degree from Oxford University, and is a graduate of the Marine Corps Command and Staff College and the Canadian National Defense College. He received his Ph.D. in modern history from Oxford University.

== Military career ==
Hammes served for 30 years in the United States Marine Corps.

== Civilian career ==
Hammes is senior research fellow at the Institute for National Strategic Studies, National Defense University.

== Research, writings, and commentaries ==
Hammes' first paper on fourth-generation warfare appeared in the Marine Corps Gazette in 1994; he developed a book-length treatment while a senior Marine fellow in the Institute for National Security Studies at the National Defense University. In this work, Sword Out Of The Stone: On War in the 21st Century, he openly criticized The Pentagon and the Joint Chiefs of Staff. Both Hammes and William Lind make use of the term "fourth-generation warfare", however Hammes considers it more of a "framework for study" rather than a revolutionary concept. Hammes traces the origins of fourth-generation warfare to Mao Zedong.

In September 2006, Hammes was one of the retired U.S. military officers who, along with Generals John Batiste and Paul Eaton, called for Secretary of Defense Donald Rumsfeld to resign. They appeared in front of the Senate Democratic Policy Committee to testify, the first prominent U.S. military officials to publicly criticize Rumsfeld. As a result of their remarks, they became widely known, with appearances on national news shows such as on CNN and NPR.

Hammes also appeared on the PBS documentary series Frontline where he criticized the use of private contractors in Iraq.

Hammes has also published two articles on strategy in the magazine Infinity Journal, both articles being quoted in, among others, the Marine Corps Gazette and the Huffington Post. The first article, published in November 2010, is "Assumptions – A Fatal Oversight", and the second, published in June 2011, is "Limited means strategy: What to do when the cupboard is bare."

== Selected bibliography ==
- Forgotten Warriors: The 1st Provisional Marine Brigade, The Corps' Ethos, and the Korean War. Lawrence, KS: University of Kansas Press, 2010. ISBN 978-0-7006-1732-6
- The Sling and the Stone: On War in the 21st Century. Zenith Press, 2006. ISBN 0-7603-2407-7
