= H. John Poole =

H. John Poole is an American military author and Marine combat veteran of Vietnam, specializing in small unit and individual tactics. His books focus on the role, training, and skills of the individual infantry soldier and Marine, and on those of the combat NCOs (non-commissioned officers). Poole has focused on terrorist and insurgent tactics, as well as the counter-insurgent tactics to defeat them.

== Influential works ==
His first work, The Last Hundred Yards, focusing on small unit infantry tactics, was widely read by USMC NCOs. In Terrorist Trail, Poole argued that the current 4th Generation Warfare (4GW) challenge facing the United States military required a similar 4GW solutions.

== Career ==
After almost 28 years as a commissioned or non-commissioned infantry officer, Poole retired from the United States Marine Corps in 1993. On active duty, he studied small-unit tactics for ten years and served for eight months as a rifle company commander in Vietnam (1968–69). After Vietnam, he developed, taught, and refined courses of instruction on maneuver warfare, land navigation, fire support coordination, call for fire, adjust fire, close air support, M203 grenade launcher, movement to contact, daylight attack, night attack, infiltration, defense, offensive Military Operations in Urban Terrain (MOUT), defensive MOUT, NBC defense, and leadership.

Since retirement, Poole has researched the small-unit tactics of other nations and written 11 tactics-and-intelligence-manual supplements. He has also conducted multi-day training sessions for 40 battalions, eight schools, and five Special Operations units on how to conduct 4th Generation Warfare at the small-unit level.

== Books by H. John Poole ==
- The Last Hundred Yards: The NCO's Contribution to Warfare (1997), ISBN 978-0-9638695-2-4
- One More Bridge to Cross: Lowering the Cost of War (1999), ISBN 978-0-9638695-3-1
- Phantom Soldier: The Enemy's Answer to U.S. Firepower (2001), ISBN 978-0-9638695-5-5
- The Tiger's Way: A U.S. Private's Best Chance for Survival (2003), ISBN 978-0-9638695-6-2
- Tactics of the Crescent Moon: Militant Muslim Combat Methods (2004), ISBN 978-0-9638695-7-9
- Militant Tricks: Battlefield Ruses of the Islamic Insurgent (2005), ISBN 978-0-9638695-8-6
- Terrorist Trail: Backtracking the Foreign Fighter (2006), ISBN 978-0-9638695-9-3
- Dragon Days: Time for "Unconventional" Tactics (2007), ISBN 978-0-9638695-4-8
- Tequila Junction: 4th-Generation Counterinsurgency (2008), ISBN 978-0-9638695-1-7
- Homeland Siege: Tactics For Police and Military (2009), ISBN 978-0-9818659-1-1
- Expeditionary Eagles: Outmaneuvering the Taliban (2010), ISBN 978-0-9818659-2-8
- Global Warrior: Averting WWIII (2011), ISBN 978-0-9818659-3-5
- ‘’ North Korea’s Hidden Assets’’ (2018), ISBN 978-0-9818659-9-7
