= Robert Spalding =

United States Air Force general

Robert S. Spalding III
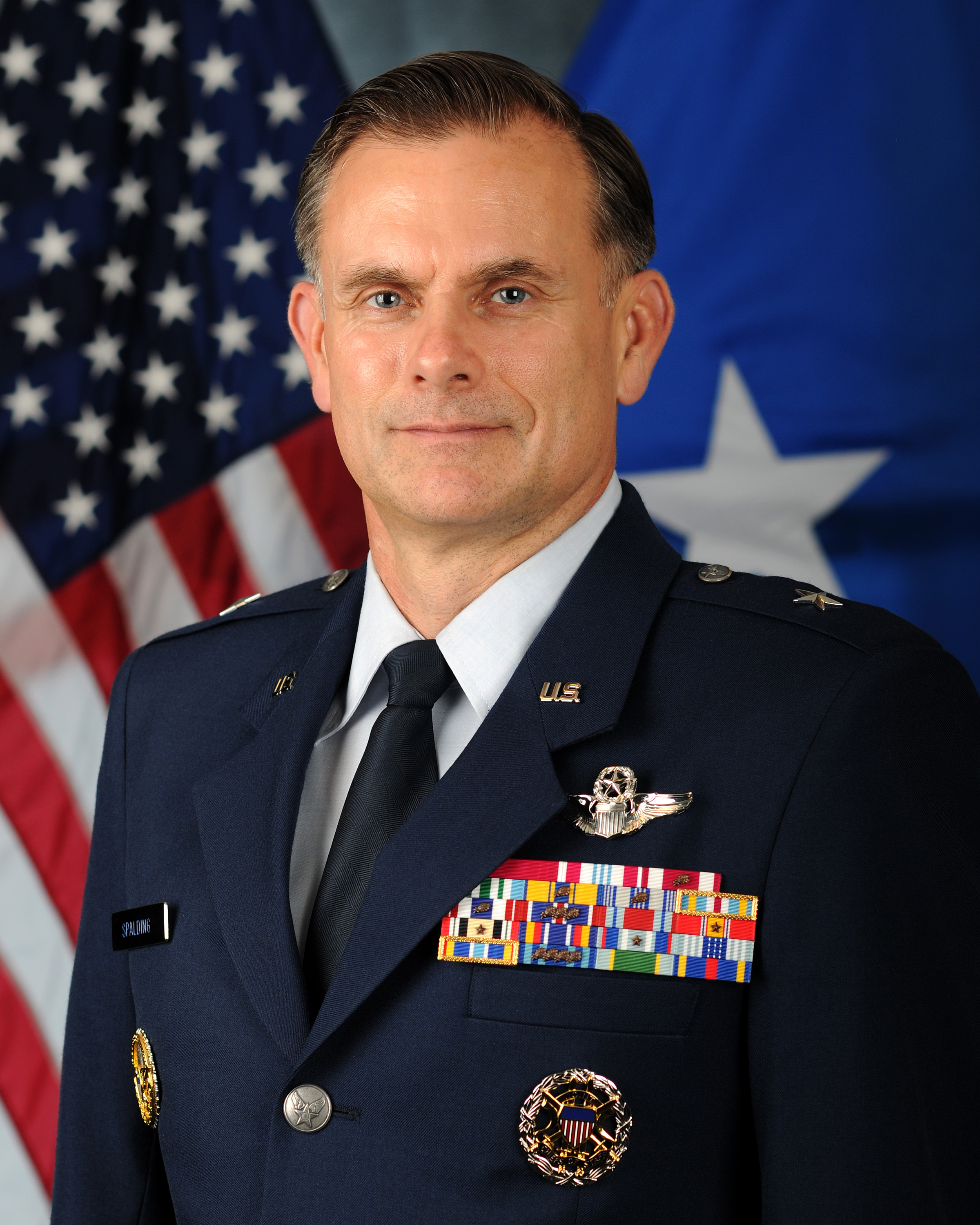
- Spalding in September 2016
- Born: 1966 (age 59–60); Missouri
- Alma mater: Fresno State University (BS, MS); University of Missouri (PhD); Air War College (MS)
- Military career
- Allegiance: United States
- Branch: United States Air Force
- Service years: 1991–2018
- Rank: Brigadier General
- Commands: 509th Operations Group; 509th Bomb Wing
- Conflicts: Iraq War
- Awards: Defense Superior Service Medal; Legion of Merit; Defense Meritorious Service Medal; Meritorious Service Medal (2); Aerial Achievement Medal (2)
- Other work: Senior Director of Strategic Planning, U.S. National Security Council; Military Fellow, Council of Foreign Relations; U.S. Senior Defense Official and Defense Attaché to China

Robert S. Spalding III (born 1966) is a retired United States Air Force brigadier general. He currently serves as a senior fellow at the Hudson Institute. His work focuses on U.S.–China relations, economic and national security, and the Asia-Pacific military balance.

== Early life and education ==
Spalding was commissioned as a second lieutenant in the United States Air Force in 1991 through the Reserve Officer Training Corps while he was studying at Fresno State University, where he earned a bachelor of science degree and a master of science degree in agricultural business, in 1987 and 1993, respectively. This was followed by a Ph.D. in economics and mathematics from University of Missouri in 2007 and a second master of science degree in Strategic Studies from Air War College in Maxwell Air Force Base in Alabama in 2008. From 2002 to 2004, he was an Air Force Olmsted Scholar and studied as a graduate research student at Tongji University in Shanghai, China.

== Career ==
=== Military career ===
Spalding received his commission in the Air Force through Fresno State University's ROTC program in 1991. In March 1992, he was appointed as the Officer in Charge of strategic plans at the 21st Space Wing at Peterson Air Force Base in Colorado, serving until August 1993. He then became a student pilot with the 87th Flying Training Squadron at Laughlin Air Force Base in Texas, from August 1993 to September 1994. Following this, he underwent B-52 Stratofortress upgrade training with the 11th Bomb Squadron at Barksdale Air Force Base in Louisiana, from November 1994 to May 1995.

From June 1995 to May 1998, Spalding served as a B-52 Pilot and aircraft commander with the 23rd Bomb Squadron at Minot Air Force Base in North Dakota. His subsequent role from May 1998 to May 2001 saw him as a T-38 Talon and B-2 Spirit Pilot, Wing Life Support officer, Conventional Strike Officer, and Chief of Training with the 325th Bomb Squadron at Whiteman Air Force Base in Missouri.

In June 2001, Spalding pursued language studies in Mandarin language at the Defense Language Institute in Monterey, California, until June 2002. Following his return from graduate research study in China, he was assigned to Whiteman AFB, as a B-2 Spirit instructor/evaluator pilot and assistant director of operations with the 393rd Bomb Squadron from April 2004 to June 2006.

Spalding's career then took him to the Pentagon, where he served as the Military Assistant to the Deputy Assistant Secretary of Defense for Defense Prisoner of War/Missing Personnel Affairs from June 2006 to July 2007. Following this, he directed the Personal Security Coordination Center in Baghdad, Iraq from August 2007 to January 2008, and subsequently served as the Deputy Director of the Strategic Plans and Initiatives Directorate at the Pentagon until June 2008. He then became the Chief of Safety for the 509th Bomb Wing at Whiteman AFB, from June 2009 to June 2010, followed by his role as the Deputy Commander of the 509th Operations Group until March 2011. Spalding then commanded the 509th OG from March 2011 to April 2012 and served as the Vice Commander of the 509th Bomb Wing until June 2013.

From July 2013 to June 2014, he was a Military Fellow at the Council on Foreign Relations in New York. Spalding then returned to the Pentagon as the Chief of the China, Mongolia, Taiwan Division, Joint Staff, J-5, from June 2014 to July 2016. He served as the U.S. Senior Defense Official and Defense Attaché to China in Beijing from December 2016 to May 2017, and subsequently as the Senior Director for Strategic Planning at the National Security Council in the White House, until January 2018. While at the National Security Council, Spalding notably wrote a memo calling for nationalizing the development of 5G wireless network. Spalding's advocacy was reportedly deemed outside his authority and he was subsequently asked to leave the NSC.

From February 2018, Spalding has been the Special Assistant to the Vice Chief of Staff, U.S. Air Force, at the Pentagon. On the same year, he retired from the military at the rank of brigadier general.

=== Political career ===
Since his retirement from the military in 2018, he has since been notable as a critic of the Chinese Communist Party.

Spalding served as a board member of We Build the Wall, the fundraising group which saw four of its members, including a former counselor to President Trump, Steve Bannon, indicted on fraud charges on August 20, 2020, “I would like to wait and see what happens. It is the case that we’re presumed innocent until proven guilty,” Spalding told the Guardian when allegations of fraud surfaced. “If it is proven true of course I would be disappointed.” Bannon was later pardoned by Trump, in one of the President's final acts in office, but two members of the group indicted with Bannon pled guilty, while the third was convicted.

== Awards and decorations ==
Personal decorations
| | Defense Superior Service Medal |
| Width-44 crimson ribbon with a pair of width-2 white stripes on the edges | Legion of Merit |
| | Defense Meritorious Service Medal |
| | Meritorious Service Medal with bronze oak leaf cluster |
| | Aerial Achievement Medal with bronze oak leaf cluster |
| | Joint Service Commendation Medal |
| | Air Force Commendation Medal with bronze oak leaf cluster |
| | Air Force Achievement Medal with bronze oak leaf cluster |
Unit awards
| | Joint Meritorious Unit Award |
| | Meritorious Unit Award with bronze oak leaf cluster |
| | Air Force Outstanding Unit Award with three bronze oak leaf clusters |
Service Awards
| | Combat Readiness Medal |
Campaign and service medals
| | National Defense Service Medal with bronze service star |
| | Iraq Campaign Medal with bronze service star |
| | Global War on Terrorism Service Medal |
| | Air and Space Campaign Medal with bronze service star |
Service, training, and marksmanship awards
| | Air Force Overseas Short Tour Service Ribbon |
| | Air and Space Expeditionary Service Ribbon |
| | Air Force Longevity Service Award with silver oak leaf cluster |
| | Small Arms Expert Marksmanship Ribbon |
| | Air Force Training Ribbon |

Other accoutrements
| US Air Force Command Pilot Badge |
| Office of the Joint Chiefs of Staff Identification Badge |
| Headquarters Air Force Badge |

== Publications ==
Spalding S., Robert (1 October 2019). Stealth War: How China Took Over While America's Elite Slept. United States: Penguin Publishing Group. ISBN 9780593084359.

Robert S., Spalding (17 May 2022). War Without Rules: China's Playbook for Global Domination. United States: Penguin Publishing (published 19 April 2022). ISBN 9780593331040.
