= Yuri M. Zhukov =

Yuri M. Zhukov is a political scientist whose research examines the causes and dynamics of armed conflict, insurgency, and state repression, with an emphasis on spatial and quantitative methods. He is an associate professor in the Department of Government and the Walsh School of Foreign Service at Georgetown University, where he also directs the Center for Eurasian, Russian and East European Studies

== Education and career ==
Zhukov received a BA from Brown University in 2003, an MA from Georgetown University in 2007, and a PhD in government from Harvard University in 2014.

He later joined Georgetown University, where he is an associate professor in the Department of Government and the Walsh School of Foreign Service and director of the Center for Eurasian, Russian and East European Studies. He has also been a visiting associate professor of public policy at the Harvard Kennedy School.

== Awards ==
Zhukov received the Bruce Russett Award from the Journal of Conflict Resolution for his 2015 article “Population Resettlement in War: Theory and Evidence from Soviet Archives”.

== Research ==
Zhukov’s research applies spatial statistics, computational modeling, and quantitative text analysis to the study of political violence, drawing on geographic and archival data. His work has addressed the diffusion of insurgent violence along road networks, the long-term political effects of mass repression under Joseph Stalin, and the motivations of rebel groups in Russia's North Caucasus.

Zhukov developed VIINA (Violent Incident Information from News Articles), a near-real-time dataset documenting events related to the Russian invasion of Ukraine. The dataset uses machine learning to identify and geolocate reported incidents from Ukrainian and Russian news sources.

== Publications ==
- Zhukov, Yuri M. (2012). “Roads and the diffusion of insurgent violence: The logistics of conflict in Russia’s North Caucasus”. Political Geography. 31 (3): 144–156. doi:10.1016/j.polgeo.2011.12.002.
- Zhukov, Yuri M.; Talibova, Roya (2018). “Stalin’s terror and the long-term political effects of mass repression”. Journal of Peace Research. 55 (2): 267–283. doi:10.1177/0022343317751261.
- Toft, Monica Duffy; Zhukov, Yuri M. (2015). “Islamists and Nationalists: Rebel Motivation and Counterinsurgency in Russia’s North Caucasus”. American Political Science Review. 109 (2): 222–238
