= 2003 ricin letters =

Attempted bioterrorist attacks

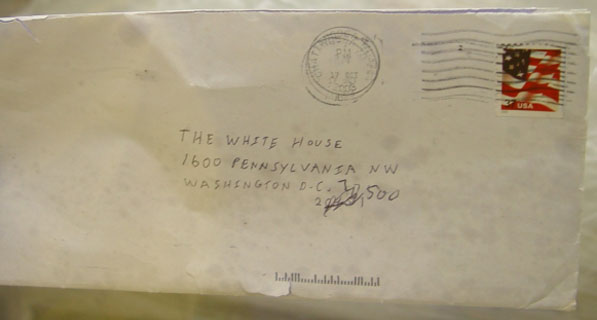
- This envelope was sent to the White House and contained a small vial of ricin powder.
- Location: Greenville, South Carolina; Washington, D.C.
- Date: October 15, 2003; November 6, 2003; February 2, 2004
- Target: U.S. Department of Transportation, The White House
- Attack type: Bioterrorism, chemical attack, attempted poisoning
- Weapon: Ricin
- Deaths: 0
- Injuries: 0
- Perpetrator: Unknown
- Motive: Retaliation for federal trucking regulations

The 2003 ricin letters were two ricin-laden letters found on two occasions between October and November 2003. One letter was mailed to the White House and intercepted at a processing facility; another was discovered with no address in South Carolina. A February 2004 ricin incident at the Dirksen Senate Office Building was initially connected to the 2003 letters as well.

The letters were sent by someone referring to themselves as "Fallen Angel". The sender, who claimed to own a trucking company, expressed anger over changes in federal trucking regulations. As of 2008, no connection between the Fallen Angel letters and the Dirksen building incident has been established. A $100,000 reward was offered in 2004 by the federal law enforcement agencies investigating the case, but to date the reward remains unclaimed.

== Background ==
=== Ricin ===
Ricin is a white powder that can be produced as a liquid or a crystal. Ricin is an extremely toxic plant protein that can cause severe allergic reactions, and exposure to small quantities can be fatal. The toxin inhibits the formation of proteins within cells of exposed people. The U.S. Centers for Disease Control and Prevention (CDC) states that 500 micrograms is the minimum lethal dose of ricin in humans provided that exposure is from injection or inhalation. Ricin is easily purified from castor-oil manufacturing waste. It has been utilized by various states and organizations as a weapon, being most effective as an assassination weapon, notably in the case of the 1978 assassination of Bulgarian dissident Georgi Markov.

=== Trucking regulations ===
On January 4, 2004 new federal transportation rules took effect which directly affected the over-the-road trucking industry in the United States. The rules took effect with a 60-day grace period and were aimed at reducing fatigue related accidents and fatalities. Called the most far-reaching rule changes in 65 years, the regulations reduced daily allowed driving time from 11 hours to 10. The most controversial measures involved the way that workdays were calculated. The calculations were not allowed to factor in such delays as food and fuel stops and other time spent waiting at, for instance, a factory for a load. The new provisions allowed drivers to stay on duty for only 14 hours; thus the time spent waiting could eat into the time a driver spent on duty. These rule changes were what the self-proclaimed "Fallen Angel" took aim at in the ricin-laden letters.

== Letters ==
=== October 2003 letter ===
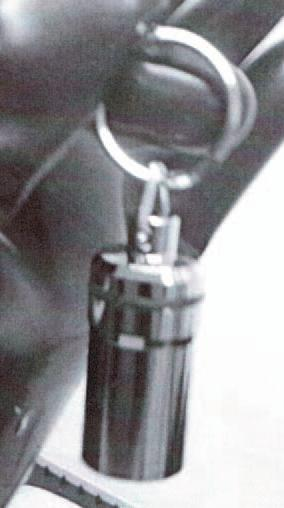
This metal vial was found in South Carolina; it contained the poison ricin.

On October 15, 2003 a package was discovered at a mail-sorting center in Greenville, South Carolina, near the Greenville-Spartanburg International Airport. The package contained a letter and a small metal vial containing ricin powder. A label on the outside of the envelope containing the vial displayed the typed message: "Caution ricin poison enclosed in sealed container. Do not open without proper protection". The presence of ricin was confirmed by the Centers for Disease Control and Prevention on October 21. The letter inside the envelope was typewritten to the U.S. Department of Transportation, and stated:

To the department of transportation: I'm a fleet owner of a tanker company. I have easy access to castor pulp. If my demand is dismissed I'm capable of making Ricin. My demand is simple, January 4, 2004 starts the new hours of service for trucks which include a ridiculous ten hours in the sleeper berth. Keep at eight or I will start dumping. You have been warned this is the only letter that will be sent by me. [sic]
Fallen Angel

Despite the potentially deadly nature of the poison, no one was exposed to, injured by, or killed by the ricin. The Greenville facility where the letter was found was also declared ricin-free in the ensuing weeks. In addition, the letter had no delivery address and no postmark.

=== November 2003 letter ===
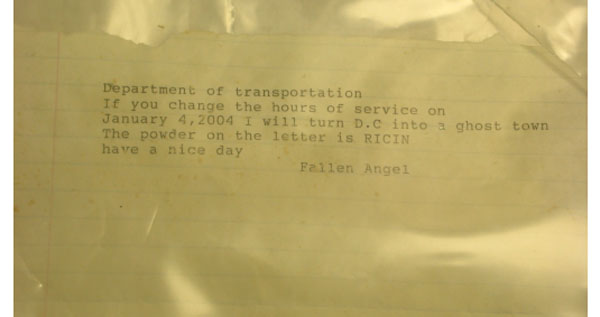
This typewritten letter was sent to the White House with a vial of ricin powder.

On November 6, 2003, another letter, described as "nearly identical" to the October letter, was discovered. This time, the letter was addressed to The White House and it was discovered at a White House mail-processing facility in Washington, D.C. The letter contained a small vial of a white powdery substance that was initially tested negative for ricin. After subsequent testing at the mail facility resulted in positives for ricin contamination on mail equipment, the U.S. Secret Service ordered a retest that showed by November 10 the letter was "probable for ricin".

The letter was postmarked on October 17 in Chattanooga, Tennessee. Though addressed to the White House, the threatening language contained in the letter was again directed at the U.S. Department of Transportation and written by someone calling themselves "Fallen Angel", as with the previous letter. The text of the letter stated:

Department of transportation
If you change the hours of service on
January 4, 2004 I will turn D.C into a ghost town
The powder on the letter is RICIN
have a nice day
Fallen Angel

The Secret Service did not alert the White House, the Federal Bureau of Investigation (FBI), or other key agencies, including the CDC, of the discovery and positive tests until November 12. In the November 21, 2003 issue of Morbidity and Mortality Weekly Report the CDC recommended that until Fallen Angel was captured, "healthcare providers and public health officials must consider ricin to be a potential public health threat and be vigilant about recognizing illness consistent with ricin exposure". The CDC's November warning mentioned only the first Fallen Angel letter. The discovery of the ricin letter at the White House facility was not disclosed to the public until early February 2004. The public disclosure of the second ricin letter from Fallen Angel coincided with the discovery of ricin in the mail room of a senate office building.

=== February 2004 mail room contamination ===
On February 2, 2004, in a mail room serving Senator Bill Frist in the Dirksen Senate Office Building, a white powdery substance was found on a sorting machine. Tests on February 3 confirmed that the substance was ricin. The positive test results were indicated by six of eight preliminary tests on the substance. The discovery resulted in more than a dozen staffers undergoing decontamination as well as the closure of the Dirksen, Hart, and Russell Senate Office Buildings. The incident was treated as a criminal probe with investigators looking carefully for any connection between the ricin found at Dirksen and the "Fallen Angel" cases.

== Investigations ==
=== Fallen Angel ===
The focus of the probe by the FBI, U.S. Postal Inspection Service (USPIS) and the Department of Transportation's Office of Inspector General fell instantly upon the "Fallen Angel" in the two letters. The FBI was the lead agency in the Fallen Angel investigation. Agents questioned various people during their probe, such as one vocal former trucker in Florida. Federal officials, most notably at the U.S. Department of Homeland Security (DHS), remarked that the letters did not have the hallmarks of international terrorism and were more likely produced by a homegrown criminal.

On January 4, 2004, the FBI, along with the USPIS and the DOT, offered a $100,000 reward in connection with the October 2003 case from Greenville, South Carolina. In late 2004 the amount of the reward was increased to $120,000. The criminal has not, thus far, been captured.

In February 2004, the United States Secret Service revealed a six-day delay between the discovery of the initial letters and informing the FBI and other agencies of their existence. White House spokesman Scott McClellan told reporters that the letter was not determined a threat to the public due to it already having been intercepted. This withholding of information was criticized by some lawmakers and public officials.

=== Dirksen Building contamination ===
Immediately following the incident in Frist's office, both the FBI and the United States Capitol Police were tasked to the investigation; like in the Fallen Angel investigation, the FBI was the lead agency. Detectives and agents focused on the possibility that the person responsible for the 2003 letters was also responsible for the contamination at the Dirksen building. Within two weeks of the incident, investigators were questioning the validity of the positive ricin tests at the Senate building. The results raised suspicion because no source (e.g. a letter) was ever found for the ricin. It was possible that the "contamination" was from paper by-products and not ricin.

However, later tests confirmed that the initial tests did not indicate a false positive and the substance was indeed ricin. By the end of March 2005, there were no suspects and no confirmed source for the ricin found in Senator Frist's office. Investigators also found no connection to the Fallen Angel case as of the same date. Despite those developments, investigators were not yet ready to declare a dead end to the investigation. As of 2008, no direct connection has yet been found between the Frist case and the Fallen Angel case and no explanation found for the origin of the ricin in Frist's office.

== See also ==
- Attacks on the United States
- 1984 Rajneeshee bioterror attack
- 2001 anthrax attacks
- April 2013 ricin letters
- Wood Green ricin plot
- Shannon Richardson, former actress who sent ricin letters to politicians in May 2013
