= Unrestricted Warfare =

1999 book on military strategy by Qiao Liang and Wang Xiangsui

- The cover to the original Simplified Chinese edition
- Authors: Wang Xiangsui; Qiao Liang
- Original title: 超限战
- Language: Chinese, English
- Publisher: People's Liberation Army Literature and Arts Publishing House
- Publication date: February 1999
- Publication place: People's Republic of China
- ISBN: 9787540318871
- Followed by: Unrestricted Warfare and Countering Unrestricted Warfare (2016)
- Website: Unrestricted Warfare at the Internet Archive

Unrestricted Warfare: Two Air Force Senior Colonels on Scenarios for War and the Operational Art in an Era of Globalization (simplified Chinese: 超限战; traditional Chinese: 超限戰; lit. 'warfare beyond bounds') is a book on military strategy written in 1999 by two colonels in the People's Liberation Army (PLA), Qiao Liang (乔良) and Wang Xiangsui (王湘穗). Its primary concern is how a nation such as China can defeat a technologically superior opponent (such as the United States) through a variety of means. Rather than focusing on direct military confrontation, this book instead examines a variety of other means, such as political warfare. Such means include using legal tools (see lawfare) and economic means as leverage over one's opponent and circumventing the need for direct military action.

== Source of text ==
The English translation of the book was first made available by the Foreign Broadcast Information Service in 1999. The book was then published in English by a previously unknown Panamanian publisher, with the subtitle "China's Master Plan to Destroy America" and a picture of the burning World Trade Center on the cover. A French translation was published in 2003.

The text was described by a report published by the US Defense Technical Information Center in 2000:

In February 1999, the PLA Literature and Arts Publishing House issued Unrestricted Warfare, a book written by two PLA air force political officers, Senior Col Qiao Liang and Senior Col Wang Xiangsui. The venue for publication and the laudatory reviews of the book in official publications suggested that Unrestricted Warfare enjoyed the support of some elements of the PLA leadership.

== Weaknesses of the United States ==
The book argues that the primary weakness of the United States in military matters is that the US views revolution in military thought solely in terms of technology. The book further argues that for the US, military doctrine evolves because new technology allows new capabilities. As such, the book argues that the United States does not consider the wider picture of military strategy, which includes legal, economic, information, technological, and biological factors, making the case that the United States is vulnerable to attack along asymmetric lines.

Certain passages of the book have aroused controversy, specifically sections suggesting terrorism as a form of asymmetric warfare in order to weaken technologically superior enemies such as the United States.

== Alternative methods of attack ==
Reducing one's opponent, the book notes, can be accomplished in a number of ways other than direct military confrontation. The book notes that these alternative methods "have the same and even greater destructive force than military warfare, and they have already produced serious threats different from the past and in many directions for...national security."

=== List of methods of attack ===
- psychological warfare
- smuggling warfare
- media warfare
- drug warfare
- network warfare
- technological warfare
- fabrication warfare
- resources warfare
- economic aid warfare
- cultural warfare
- international law warfare

== Defense against unrestricted warfare ==
The authors note that an old-fashioned mentality that considers military action the only offensive action is inadequate given the new range of threats. Instead, the authors advocate forming a "composite force in all aspects related to national interest. Moreover, given this type of composite force, it is also necessary to have this type of composite force to become the means that can be utilized for actual operations. This should be a "grand warfare method" that combines all of the dimensions and methods in the two major areas of military and non-military affairs so as to carry out warfare. This is the opposite of the formula for warfare methods brought forth in past wars."

== Impact and reception ==
Originally published as a work of military theory, the book has recently garnered renewed interest against the backdrop of deteriorating US-China relations and the trade war initiated by the first Trump Administration. The book is the subject of extensive study by both current and former members of the US military establishment, with numerous papers and articles published on the subject by the National Defense University, Army University Press, and the School of Advanced Warfighting. The book is also the source of inspiration for many separate books, such as Stealth War and War Without Rules by US Air Force Brigadier General Robert Spalding.

The content of the book has also been cited as the source of inspiration for hardline US policies towards the People's Republic of China by former chief strategist to the president of the United States, Steve Bannon.

The whole [Chinese] strategy is to avoid kinetic warfare and focus on information and economic [warfare]....I told him [Trump] China has been engaging in an economic war against us for the past 20 or 25 years.

— Steve Bannon, Former Chief Strategist to the President of the United States

== See also ==
- Assassin's Mace
- Chinese information operations and information warfare
- Thirty-Six Stratagems
- Transnational lawfare by China
- United Front Work Department
