= Kinetic warfare =

Term for military combat involving direct physical destruction

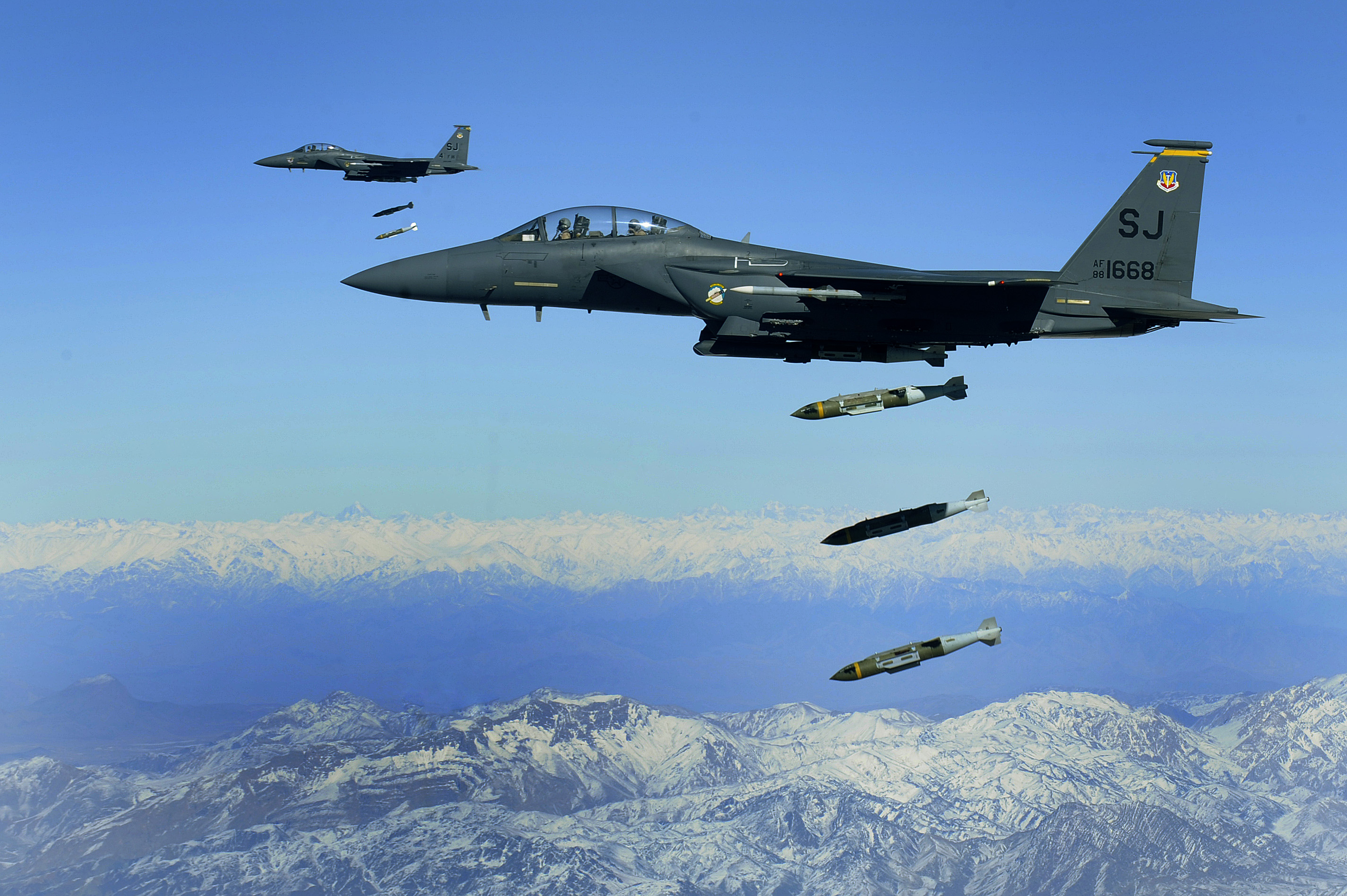
American F-15E Strike Eagles dropping JDAMs upon Afghanistan.

Kinetic warfare is a term for military combat or other forms of directly-destructive warfare, to contrast "soft" force such as diplomacy, lawfare, sanctions, cyberwarfare, psychological warfare, information warfare, or other types of warfare. The term emerged as military jargon before it became used in wider circles at the turn of the millennium.

"Kinetic military action" was used by White House aide Ben Rhodes on March 23, 2011 to describe U.S. military action in Libya:

I think what we are doing is enforcing a resolution that has a very clear set of goals, which is protecting the Libyan people, averting a humanitarian crisis, and setting up a no-fly zone... Obviously that involves kinetic military action, particularly on the front end.

In 2019, U.S. Department of Defense used "kinetic operations" on a webpage about Operation Inherent Resolve. It contained an interactive graphic titled "AIRSTRIKES IN IRAQ AND SYRIA" and captioned "... operations related to ISIL since kinetic operations started on Aug. 8, 2014 ...".

On February 11, 2015, President Obama wrote in a letter to Congress that he wanted Congress to "authorize the use of U.S. forces [against ISIL] in ... [ground] missions to enable kinetic strikes". The phrase was not used in the draft resolution proposed to Congress.

On December 2, 2015, Secretary of State John Kerry spoke after attending a series of NATO meetings in Brussels, “There are various ways in which countries can contribute; they don’t necessarily have to be troops, engaged in kinetic action. There are medical facilities, there are other assets that can be deployed, there is intelligence gathering.”

On February 13, 2024, the United States Government Accountability Office issued a report regarding the law of armed conflict in kinetic warfare, stating that "Since 2012, AFRICOM and CENTCOM have conducted thousands of kinetic strikes. Such strikes must comply with the law of war."

Secretary Donald Rumsfeld among others used the words "kinetic" and "non-kinetic" often.

== Kinetic Sanctions ==
Following the 2022 Russian invasion of Ukraine, 'Kinetic sanctions' has become popular as a term to denote Ukrainian strikes against infrastructure in Russia

== See also ==
- Three warfares
- Hybrid warfare
