= Marine Corps Gazette =

Professional journal for the United States Marine Corps

- August 2022 issue cover
- Publisher: Marine Corps Association
- Founder: John A. Lejeune
- First issue: 1916; 110 years ago
- Country: United States
- Based in: Quantico, Virginia
- Website: www.mca-marines.org/magazines/marine-corps-gazette/
- ISSN: 0025-3170

The Marine Corps Gazette is a professional journal by and for members of the United States Marine Corps. Known as "The Professional Journal of U.S. Marines", the Gazette was founded in 1916 at Marine Corps Base Quantico by Colonel John A. Lejeune as the vehicle to launch the Marine Corps Association (MCA). The MCA continues to publish the Gazette alongside Leatherneck Magazine. The headquarters of the Gazette is in Quantico, Virginia.

Originally published quarterly from 1916 through 1942, the Gazette transitioned to a bi-monthly cycle in 1943 and then monthly in 1944. Active duty Marines staffed the journal until a change of law in 1976 prompted the Gazette to rely on retired Marines and civilians for publication. Since November 2006, the entire Gazette is available online to members and from Google Books.

The Marine Corps Gazette is available in magazine form, online, and on a mobile app. The magazine has over 15,000 monthly readers.

== Mission and focus ==
The Gazette's mission is to provide a forum for the exchange of ideas that advance knowledge, interest, and morale in the Marine Corps. The Gazette is also a vehicle for the dissemination of military art and science among Marines. The focus of the journal is to invite debate from readers on the important issues facing the Marine Corps today. The Gazette is of, by, and for Marines, and uses a combination of solicitation for articles, writing contests, and unsolicited manuscripts. The journal occasionally reprints articles from other professional journals.

== Notable editors ==
- Oliver P. Smith – The commander of the 1st Marine Division at the Battle of Chosin Reservoir during the Korean War was editor-in-chief from March 1946 to April 1948.
- Edwin H. Simmons – Known as "the collective memory of the Marine Corps", Brigadier General Simmons was the managing editor from October 1946 to September 1949, with a brief stint as editor and publisher in early 1947.
- Samuel R. Shaw – Brigadier general in the Marine Corps and advisor to President John F. Kennedy in the 1962 Cuban Missile Crisis. He served as editor following his retirement in 1977.

The current editor-in-chief is Col. Christopher Woodbridge, USMC (Ret).
