= Wang Xiangsui =

Chinese military writer (born 1954)

- 王湘穗

Director of the Center for Strategic Issues
- In office 2012–Present

Personal details
- Born: October 1954 (age 71–72) Guangzhou, China
- Party: Chinese Communist Party
- Education: Beihang University
- Occupation: Author, Academic, Military Theorist

Military service
- Branch/service: People's Liberation Army Air Force
- Years of service: 1970 - 2012
- Rank: Colonel (Retired)

Wang Xiangsui (王湘穗, born October 1, 1954) is a professor at Beihang University in Beijing, China and a retired senior Colonel in the People's Liberation Army. He is also a co-author of Unrestricted Warfare, a book which dictates that no country is capable of defeating a superpower, such as the United States, on its own terms. The book outlines steps that could weaken such superpowers, through unconventional means, including manipulation of banking systems, control of the media and natural resources.

== Biography ==
Wang is a retired PLA colonel.

As of at least 2024, he is the director of the Centre for Strategic Research at Beihang University.

He along with Qiao Liang is the co-author of numerous books of military theory, the most prominent of which is Unrestricted Warfare which has influenced the strategic thinking of the People's Liberation Army as well as the United States in its policy towards China, Wang is also the author of numerous other books including: On the Quality of Officers, Exposition of the World's Military Powers, and Records of World Wars.

== Views ==
Wang's research and writing focuses on military strategy.

In Unrestricted Warfare, Wang and Qiao write that no superpower has ever been defeated on its own terms. According to this view, those who wish to compete with superpowers must develop asymmetrical capabilities.

According to Wang, China's most important bilateral relationship is its relationship with Russia, and that "only when China and Russia become the United States' undefeatable opponents will they become its most respected friends."

Wang views Russia's invasion of Ukraine as advancing multi-polarity against United States hegemony. Wang describes Ukraine and Europe as having lost the most from the conflict. Wang contends that although the U.S. has profited financially from the war, it is appearing unreliable to its partners in the West.

== Published Works ==
Xiangsui, Wang; Liang, Qiao (1 February 1999). Unrestricted Warfare (in Chinese). China: People's Liberation Army Arts and Literature Press. ISBN 9787540318871.

Xiangsui, Wang (1 April 2012). Catch up and Contain (in Chinese). China: Changjiang Literature and Art Publishing House. ISBN 9787535456113.

Xiangsui, Wang; Liang, Qiao (February 2017). On the Quality of Officers (in Chinese). China: Beijing Yangtze River New Century Corporation. ISBN 9787535456328.

== See also ==
- Three warfares
