= Qiao Liang (author) =

Chinese general

- 乔良

Council for National Security Policy Studies
- In office 2018–2022

Personal details
- Born: January 1955 (age 71) Xin County, Shanxi, China
- Party: Chinese Communist Party
- Education: People's Liberation Army Air Force Command College; Peking University
- Occupation: Author, military theorist

Military service
- Branch/service: People's Liberation Army Air Force
- Years of service: 1972–2018
- Rank: Major General

Qiao Liang (Chinese: 乔良; pinyin: Qiáo Liáng; born 9 January 1955) is a retired major general in the People's Liberation Army Air Force (PLAAF), military theorist, and author. He is the deputy director of the creative department of the PLAAF, the deputy secretary-general of the Council for National Security Policy Studies, and a member of the Chinese Writers Association. In 2007, he presented a lecture series on China Central Television (CCTV) about the Thirty-Six Stratagems.

== Biography ==
Qiao was born in 1955 to a military family. He enlisted in the People's Liberation Army Air Force in 1972, serving in a variety of technical posts at Lanzhou Military District. He was eventually promoted to the rank of Major General and began working at the PLAAF Command College by 2011.

According to his official biography, Qiao is a member of the People's Liberation Airforce Air Force Expert Committee, a member of the Rocket Force Military Theory Advisory Expert Group, and a frequent keynote speaker on China Central Television (CCTV)'s "Hundred Lectures" series.

Qiao began writing fiction in 1974, and he was admitted to the Chinese Writers Association in 1984.

In 1999, he co-authored the book Unrestricted Warfare with Wang Xiangsui, exploring how the United States could hypothetically be defeated by technologically inferior forces, and how the concept of warfare could be expanded beyond traditional battlefield engagements. Qiao and Wang later published an updated edition of Unrestricted Warfare.

== Major works ==
=== Military theory ===
- Liang, Qiao; Xiangsui, Wang (1999). Unrestricted Warfare (in Chinese). China: People's Liberation Army Arts and Literature Press. ISBN 9787540318871.
- Liang, Qiao (2016). The Arc of Empires (in Chinese). China: Changjiang Literature and Art Publishing House. ISBN 9787535486769.
- Liang, Qiao; Xiangsui, Wang (2017). On the Quality of Officers (in Chinese). China: Beijing Yangtze River New Century Corporation. ISBN 9787535456328.
- Global Military Rankings
- An Outline PLAAF Offense and Defense
- On Army Reform

==== In translation ====
- Liang, Qiao; Xiangsui, Wang (2002) [1999]. Unrestricted Warfare: China's Master Plan to Destroy America. ISBN 9780971680722.

=== Fiction ===
- Liang, Qiao (1995). 末日之门 [The Gate of Doom] (in Chinese). China: Kunlun Publishing House. ISBN 9787800402487.
- Thunder Echo Canyon
- Army Banner
- A Distant Wind
- Chronicles of Cities and Bosses

== See also ==
- Three warfares
