= Transnational lawfare by China =

The People's Republic of China (PRC) has increasingly utilized non-Chinese legal systems and institutions to advance its objectives beyond its borders. This practice and its variations have been described as lawfare.

== Concept ==
Lawfare is the use of legal systems and institutions to affect foreign or domestic affairs, as a more peaceful and rational alternative, or as a less benign adjunct, to warfare. The government of the People's Republic of China has recognized lawfare (Chinese: 法律战; pinyin: Fǎlǜ zhàn; lit. 'legal warfare') as an essential component of its strategic doctrine. Lawfare is part of the People's Liberation Army (PLA)'s "three warfares" doctrine approved by the Chinese Communist Party (CCP) for guiding its political warfare and information influence operations.

== Methods ==
China has employed Interpol Red Notices, which request the provisional arrest of individuals pending extradition, to target dissidents using financial crime as the most common pretext. Other bases cited include terrorism and practicing Falun Gong in China.

China has also sought to influence extradition proceedings and abuse foreign government databases to monitor or suppress critics abroad.

=== Civil lawsuits ===
China and its state-linked entities have increasingly filed civil lawsuits in foreign courts against dissidents and critics abroad. According to Radio Free Asia, legal experts say that many cases likely go unnoticed because they are filed by state proxies to cover Beijing's direct role. While framed as legal disputes involving fraud or misconduct, human rights advocates argue that these suits are often intended to silence or coerce the targets. Even when unsuccessful, such lawsuits can impose heavy financial and emotional burdens on defendants. John Moolenaar, U.S. Representative and chair of the Select Committee on the CCP, and Eric Sayers, managing director of Beacon Global Strategies, have accused the Chinese Communist Party or government of using Chinese companies such as Autel Robotics to pursue strategic lawsuits against public participation (SLAPP).

=== Criminal investigations ===
In October 2025, Xinhua News Agency announced that the Chongqing public security bureau was investigating Taiwanese legislator Puma Shen for "secession-related" activities under the Criminal Law of the People's Republic of China. Taiwanese officials stated that the investigation was meant to "create the illusion of long-arm jurisdiction over Taiwan" and "sow divisions and instill fear." Others have described this investigation as an example of lawfare.

== Concerns ==
Critics argue that the burden of challenging politically motivated Interpol Red Notices often falls on individual countries or defendants, which can legitimize authoritarian aims under the appearance of legality.

Legal scholars note that U.S. legal doctrines such as the Foreign Sovereign Immunities Act (FSIA) and international comity can create an imbalance. Authoritarian states can initiate lawsuits in U.S. courts while being protected from similar suits themselves, enabling one-sided legal harassment of political opponents.

Although Chinese companies may have valid grounds to pursue defamation lawsuits to address false allegations, experts caution that lawsuits aimed at individual researchers, nonprofit organizations, or media outlets raise different issues, with concerns that the legal tools are being used strategically to silence legitimate criticism and academic research.

== Examples ==
In 2018 Peng Xufeng and his wife were sued in California by Changsha Metro Group Co., a Chinese state-owned company, for alleged bribery and misconduct. Observers noted that the case appeared to align with the CCP political objectives as well as commercial claims.

In 2018 Xu Jin and Liu Fang were sued by Xinba Construction Group Co. in New Jersey for alleged corruption. They countersued, claiming harassment by Chinese operatives, including surveillance and the kidnapping of a family member in China. The Wall Street Journal described the lawsuit as an example of the CCP's lawfare.

In March 2019, Polish authorities detained Chinese-born Swedish citizen Li Zhihui, a Falun Gong follower, based on an Interpol Red Notice requested by the PRC for alleged fraud. Although a lower court approved the extradition, Poland's Supreme Court later overturned the decision. The Swedish government voiced opposition to the extradition. Li was released in March 2021 after two years in detention.

In July 2021, Uyghur activist Idris Hasan, also known as Yidiresi Aishan, was arrested by the Moroccan authorities under an Interpol Red Notice requested by the PRC, which was seeking his extradition on allegations of "belonging to a terrorist organization." Although Interpol cancelled the notice in August 2021, a Moroccan court approved his extradition later that December. Advocacy groups campaigned against his extradition to China, and he was released from a Moroccan prison in February 2025, after 43 months in detention.

In 2021, a Hong Kong lawmaker called for the extradition under the PRC-introduced National Security Law of two Danish legislators who hosted Ted Hui, an exiled member of Hong Kong's Legislative Council. While no formal request was made, the Chinese embassy in Denmark sought legal assistance, prompting Denmark's intelligence services to warn those targeted of potential legal risks while traveling abroad.

According to Radio Free Asia, in 2023, Hui Muslim activist Ma Ju was sued in New York by a Chinese state-linked entity for $12.5 million following his public reporting on religious repression of Muslims in Xinjiang. Radio Free Asia reported that legal experts viewed the lawsuit as retaliation.

In 2023 John Chen and Lin Feng, unregistered PRC agents, sought to manipulate the whistleblower program of the IRS against Shen Yun Performing Arts, which is affiliated with Falun Gong, by filing a defective complaint with the IRS aimed at stripping the entity of its tax-exempt status. Both were later sentenced for bribing an IRS official to influence the IRS's handling of the complaint. According to Canadian legal counsel David Matas, lawfare has been used by China to suppress Falun Gong in other countries, including the United States.

== Responses ==
According to Freedom House, China's use of transnational lawfare risks undermining democratic legal systems and reshaping global norms to favor authoritarian governance models.

In September 2024, the United States House Select Committee on Strategic Competition between the United States and the Chinese Communist Party held a hearing titled "How the CCP Uses the Law to Silence Its Critics and Enforce Its Rule." Expert witnesses recommended anti-SLAPP legislation and disclosure requirements for foreign parties or funders involved in U.S. litigation. At a December 2024 hearing of the U.S. Congressional-Executive Commission on China, an expert witness recommended amending the Foreign Agents Registration Act to require disclosure of foreign funding in U.S. litigation. The U.S. Senate also examined China's role in the American legal system. An expert witness described how China reportedly leverages the U.S. legal system to silence critics of the PRC by burdening them with costly litigation.

In a July 2025 report on transnational repression (TNR), the UK Parliament's Joint Committee on Human Rights found that authoritarian governments, including China and Russia, have used SLAPPs in the UK to intimidate and silence critics. The committee also discussed China in connection with bounties issued by the Hong Kong government targeting pro-democracy activists who had fled to the UK. The committee recommended that the UK government expand protections for defendants in SLAPP cases where it is used as a TNR tool, and introduce a mechanism to notify individuals when there is credible evidence that an Interpol red notice is politically motivated.

== See also ==
- Vexatious litigation
- Transnational repression by China
- Extraterritorial jurisdiction
