= Three Closenesses =

Chinese Communist Party term

The Three Closenesses (Chinese: 三贴近) is a political concept first proposed under Chinese Communist Party (CCP) general secretary Hu Jintao in January 2003.

== History ==
In January 2003, CCP Politburo member Li Changchun announced the Three Closenesses and said that emphasis of propaganda work should be uniting the "spirit" of the CCP with public opinion. In early 2003, while leading members of the Politburo to visit Xibaipo, Hu Jintao put forward the concept. Li Changchun said in September 2003 that the concepts reflect the basic demands of maintaining correct guidance of public opinion.

== Concepts ==
The Three Closenesses are:

- Closeness to reality (贴近实际)
- Closeness to the masses (贴近群众)
- Closeness to real life (贴近生活)

== See also ==
- Public opinion guidance
- Public opinion struggle
