= Jessica Chen Weiss =

American political scientist

- Born: Seattle, Washington, U.S.
- Other name: 白潔曦
- Education: Stanford University (BA); University of California, San Diego (PhD)
- Occupation: International relations scholar
- Employer(s): Johns Hopkins University, Asia Society Policy Institute
- Notable work: Powerful Patriots: Nationalist Protest in China’s Foreign Relations (2014 book)
- Board member of: National Committee on U.S.-China Relations
- Website: www.jessicachenweiss.com

Jessica Chen Weiss is an American international relations scholar specializing in China–United States relations. She is currently the David M. Lampton Professor of China Studies at Johns Hopkins SAIS and Senior Fellow in Chinese Politics, Foreign Policy, and National Security at Asia Society Policy Institute's Center for China Analysis.

== Early life and education ==
Weiss was born and grew up in Seattle, Washington. She obtained a bachelor of arts degree from Stanford University in 2003 and attended the University of California, San Diego, graduating in 2008 with a PhD in Political Science.

== Career ==
In 2014, Oxford University Press published her book Powerful Patriots: Nationalist Protest in China’s Foreign Relations.

She was senior advisor to the United States Department of State's Policy Planning Staff from August 2021 to July 2022. She was the Michael J. Zak Professor for China and Asia-Pacific Studies at Cornell University's Department of Government.

She has advocated for the U.S. government to avoid an "overly confrontational" approach in its relations with China, and published an article in Foreign Affairs in August 2022 espousing this approach. Ian Johnson described that article in The New Yorker as catapulting her "to the front ranks of the growing number of China experts concerned that U.S. foreign policy suffers from an unhealthy focus on China as a threat."

Weiss is a participant of the Task Force on U.S.-China Policy convened by Asia Society's Center on US-China Relations and a board member of the National Committee on U.S.-China Relations.

In July 2024, Weiss left Cornell to become the David M. Lampton Professor of China Studies at Johns Hopkins SAIS.

== Publications ==
=== Books ===
- Powerful Patriots: Nationalist Protest in China's Foreign Relations (Oxford University Press, 2014, ISBN 9780199387557)

=== Articles ===
- The Case Against the China Consensus, Foreign Affairs, September 16, 2024
- The Perils of Estrangement (in What Does America Want From China?), Foreign Affairs, May 30, 2024 (co-authored with James Steinberg)
- Taiwan and the True Sources of Deterrence, Foreign Affairs, November 30, 2023 (co-authored with Bonnie S. Glaser and Thomas J. Christensen)
- Authoritarian Signaling, Mass Audiences, and Nationalist Protest in China, 2013, International Organization
