= Thomas J. Christensen =

American political scientist (born 1962)

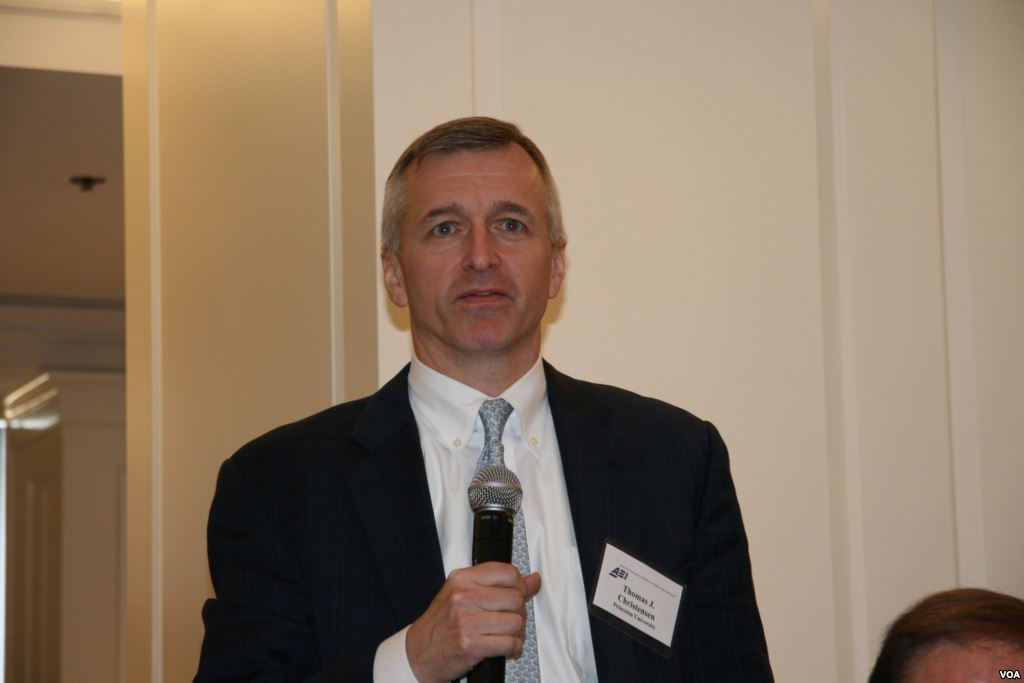
- Christensen in 2015

Academic background
- Education: Haverford College (BA); University of Pennsylvania (MA); Columbia University (PhD)
- Influences: Robert Jervis

Academic work
- Discipline: Political science
- Institutions: Cornell University; Massachusetts Institute of Technology; Princeton University; Columbia University

Chinese name
- Traditional Chinese: 柯慶生
- Simplified Chinese: 柯庆生
Transcriptions
Standard Mandarin
- Hanyu Pinyin: Kē Qìng Shēng

Thomas J. Christensen (born 1962) is an American political scientist. He is the James T. Shotwell Professor of International Relations at the School of International and Public Affairs, Columbia University.

== Education ==
Christensen received his B.A. with honors from Haverford College, an M.A. in International Relations from the University of Pennsylvania, and Ph.D. in political science from Columbia University. Among his advisers at Columbia was Robert Jervis. His research interests include international relations, security, and the international relations of East Asia.

== Career ==
From 2006 to 2008, he also served as Deputy Assistant Secretary of State for East Asian and Pacific Affairs.

Christensen taught at Cornell University, Massachusetts Institute of Technology, Princeton University, where he co-founded the China in the World program with Harvard professor Alastair Ian Johnston in 2004. He was the William P. Boswell Professor of World Politics of Peace and War at Princeton University before joining the Columbia faculty in fall of 2018. He also sits on the faculty of the Weatherhead East Asian Institute at Columbia.

He has been described as a China expert by numerous Chinese and American publications. Gideon Rose called his views on the international system as neorealist.

Christensen served as a founding member of the Academic Advisory Council of the Schwarzman Scholars program. He was also a silver medalist of the 2016 Arthur Ross Book Award from the Council on Foreign Relations.

In 2020, Christensen, along with over 130 other former Republican national security officials, signed a statement asserting that President Donald Trump was unfit to serve another term, and "To that end, we are firmly convinced that it is in the best interest of our nation that Vice President Joe Biden be elected as the next President of the United States, and we will vote for him."

He is a participant of the Task Force on U.S.-China Policy convened by the Asia Society's Center on US-China Relations.

== Publications ==
=== Articles ===
- Taiwan and the True Sources of Deterrence, Foreign Affairs, November 30, 2023 (co-authored with Bonnie S. Glaser and Jessica Chen Weiss)
