= Jude Blanchette =

American foreign policy analyst & China specialist

- Other name: 白明
- Education: Loyola University Maryland (BA); University of Oxford (MA)
- Occupation: Policy analyst
- Employer: RAND Corporation

Jude Blanchette is an American foreign policy analyst and China specialist. He is the Distinguished Tang Chair in China Research and inaugural director of the China Research Center at the RAND Corporation. He served as Freeman Chair in China studies at the Center for Strategic and International Studies (CSIS) from August 2019 to December 2024.

== Education ==
Blanchette holds a BA in economics from Loyola University Maryland and a MA in modern Chinese studies from the University of Oxford.

== Career ==
Blanchette was named RAND's Distinguished Tang Chair in China Research in December 2024. Prior to joining CSIS, Blanchette was engagement director at the Conference Board's China Center for Economics and Business in Beijing and before that, assistant director of University of California, San Diego's 21st Century China Center. He is a participant of the Task Force on U.S.-China Policy convened by the Asia Society's Center on US-China Relations.

== Publications ==
=== Books ===
- China's New Red Guards: The Return of Radicalism and the Rebirth of Mao Zedong, Oxford University Press, 2019

=== Reports ===
- After annexation: How China plans to run Taiwan, Lowy Institute, May 11, 2026 (co-authored with Richard McGregor)
- Building International Support for Taiwan, CSIS, February 13, 2024 (co-authored with Ryan Hass and Lily McElwee)

=== Articles ===
- China Is in Denial About the War in Ukraine, Foreign Affairs, August 13, 2024
- The Illusion of Great-Power Competition, Foreign Affairs, July 24, 2023 (co-authored with Christopher Johnstone)
- The Taiwan Long Game, Foreign Affairs, December 20, 2022 (co-authored with Ryan Hass)
- Party of One, Foreign Affairs, October 14, 2022
- China on the Offensive, Foreign Affairs, August 1, 2022 (co-authored with Bonny Lin)
- Xi Jinping's Faltering Foreign Policy, Foreign Affairs, March 16, 2022
- China's Ukraine Crisis, Foreign Affairs, February 21, 2022 (co-authored with Bonny Lin)
- Xi's Confidence Game, Foreign Affairs, November 23, 2021
- China's Afghanistan Dilemma, Foreign Affairs, September 13, 2021 (co-authored with Seth G. Jones)
- China's Looming Succession Crisis, Foreign Affairs, July 20, 2021 (co-authored with Richard McGregor)
- Xi's Gamble, Foreign Affairs, June 22, 2021
- Why Xi's Power Grab Will Hurt China's Prospects for Reform, Foreign Affairs, November 14, 2017

=== U.S. Congressional testimonies ===
- Testimony before the U.S.-China Economic and Security Review Commission Hearing on "An Assessment of the CCP's Economic Ambitions, Plans, and Metrics of Success" Panel II: "Understanding China's Economic Drivers and Ecosystem", April 15, 2020
