= Project Troy =

Project Troy was a research study of psychological warfare undertaken for the Department of State by a group of scholars including physicists, historians and psychologists from Harvard University, the Massachusetts Institute of Technology and RAND Corporation in the fall of 1950. The Project Troy Report to the Secretary of State, presented to Secretary Dean Acheson on 1 February 1951, made various proposals for political warfare, including possible methods of minimizing the effects of Soviet jamming on the Voice of America broadcasts.

== History ==
During World War II the United States Office of War Information (OWI) launched a large-scale information and propaganda campaign both at home and abroad through radio broadcasts, newspapers, posters, photographs, films and other forms of media, but psychological warfare operations had been run by special military units.

After the end of the war President Truman transferred the operations of the OWI as well as control over Voice of America overseas radio network to the Interim International Information Service (IIS) within the State Department. The State Department, eager to assert leadership in this area, organized a civilian-sponsored project on new methods and approaches to Cold War propaganda, code-named Project Troy. Convened in October 1950 at the State Department's request, it brought together for a period of almost three months a group of twenty-one distinguished scientists, social scientists, and historians, most of whom were academics.

It can be assumed that the Truman administration tried to implement plans established by the Project Troy in the project Overload and Delay. The purpose of the latter was to break the Stalinist system by increasing the number of input points in the system and by creating complex and unpredictable situations requiring action.

== Memorandum on the Troy Report ==
On 26 March 1951 Robert J. Hooker delivered a memorandum on the Troy Report to the Director of the Policy Planning Staff Paul Nitze, asserting that the report "deserves the most serious consideration. It lays down principles and techniques for the conduct of political warfare which, with few exceptions, seem worthy of adoption."
