= Bonny Lin =

American political scientist

- Other names: 林洋
- Education: Yale University (PhD), University of Michigan (MA), Harvard College (BA)
- Occupation: Political scientist
- Employer: Center for Strategic and International Studies
- Organization(s): RAND Corporation, Institute for Defense Analysis

Bonny Lin is an American political scientist currently serving as senior fellow for Asian security and director of the China Power Project at the Center for Strategic and International Studies (CSIS).

== Education ==
Lin holds a BA in government from Harvard, a MA in Asian studies (focused on China) from the University of Michigan, and a PhD in political science from Yale.

== Career ==
Prior to joining CSIS in June 2021, Lin was a political scientist at the RAND Corporation and acting associate director of the Strategy and Doctrine Program of RAND Project AIR FORCE.

From 2015 to 2018, Lin was a county director and senior adviser for China in the Office of the U.S. Secretary of Defense.

== Publications ==
=== Articles ===
- The Looming Crisis in the Taiwan Strait, Foreign Affairs, July 2, 2024 (co-authored with Bonnie S. Glaser)
- Blinders, Blunders, and Wars: What America and China Can Learn, RAND Corporation, 2014 (co-authored with David C. Gompert and Hans Binnendijk)

=== Congressional testimonies ===
- U.S. Allied and Partner Support for Taiwan: Responses to a Chinese Attack on Taiwan and Potential U.S. Taiwan Policy Changes, U.S.-China Economic and Security Review Commission, February 18, 2021
