= Public opinion struggle =

Chinese Communist Party term

Public opinion struggle (Chinese: 舆论斗争; pinyin: Yúlùn dòuzhēng) is a term used by the Chinese Communist Party (CCP) to describe its ideology and propaganda work. Since Xi Jinping became the CCP general secretary in 2012, the term has frequently appeared in the party's internal and external propaganda documents and leadership speeches.

== History ==
The phrase was first mentioned in the People's Daily in 1980, but did not enter into common use until 2013 during the general secretaryship of Xi Jinping; nearly all previous uses were mentions of "international public opinion struggle" or against superstition. On 19 August 2013, Xi Jinping gave a speech at the National Ideological and Propaganda Work Conference, later known as the August 19 speech. Initial reporting of the speech did not mention the term public opinion struggle. On 21 August, the General Political Department of the People's Liberation Army issued a notice on the study and interpretation of Xi's speech, which said that the speech included several key issues, including "positive propaganda and the public opinion struggle". On 24 August, the CCP tabloid newspaper Global Times published an editorial titled "The Public Opinion Struggle: A Challenge We Cannot Avoid But Must Face Head On". In reaction, on 27 August, Cao Lin wrote an article in the China Youth Daily titled "The Term 'Public Opinion Struggle' Makes People Uneasy", saying that "Using the term 'public opinion struggle' to characterize the current ideological conflict ushers us back into the past".

On 30 August, the People's Daily published an editorial titled "A Scientific Guide to Consolidating and Strengthening Mainstream Ideology and Public Opinion", which called to "effectively channel public opinion and actively launch a public opinion struggle"; the article was attributed to the People's Daily editorial board, the first such attribution since 1946. The People's Daily published an editorial, and numerous other news agencies issued their own articles on the topic.

== Contemporary usage ==
In contemporary Chinese Communist Party discourse, public opinion struggle is framed as a long-term, systematic task linked to ideological security and discourse power. Scholars have described this Xi-era usage as a consolidation and elevation of earlier propaganda and public opinion guidance practices, and have characterized it as an institutionalized component of political control and legitimacy maintenance in governance.

In a May 2021 Politburo of the Chinese Communist Party study session on international communication, Xi Jinping stated that China is engaged in a "public opinion struggle" and urged efforts to build a "credible, lovable, and respectable" image of the country abroad amid diplomatic setbacks and tensions.

== See also ==
- Three warfares
- Chinese information operations and information warfare
- Cognitive warfare
- Propaganda in China
