= Powerful Patriots: Nationalist Protest in China's Foreign Relations =

2014 non-fiction book by Jessica Chen Weiss

Powerful Patriots: Nationalist Protest in China’s Foreign Relations
- Author: Jessica Chen Weiss
- Subjects: Foreign relations of China, China–Japan relations, China–United States relations
- Genre: Non-fiction
- Publisher: Oxford University Press
- Publication date: 1 September 2014
- Pages: 341
- ISBN: 9780199387557
- Website: academic.oup.com/book/27416

Powerful Patriots: Nationalist Protest in China’s Foreign Relations is a 2014 non-fiction book by Jessica Chen Weiss.

It details the extent to which public protests are forbidden, permitted, or encouraged by the Chinese government and how the government uses nationalism to advance its foreign policy.

== Publication ==
Powerful Patriots was published by Oxford University Press in 2014 and was written by American political scientist Jessica Chen Weiss.

== Synopsis ==
The book details the extent to which public protests are forbidden, permitted, or encouraged by the Chinese government and how the government uses nationalism to advance its foreign policy. In discussing Beijing's leadership style, the author compares China's autocratic governance to that of Jordan and Syria. The book describes the history of Chinese politics, focussing on the government's nationalism and relationship with both the United States and Japan. The book has an introduction, seven case studies, and a conclusion.

== Critical reception ==
Daniel C. Lynch, writing in The China Journal, describes the book's contents as "novel, counterintuitive, and stimulating" and praises the "detailed case studies" and "counterintuitive ideas." June Teufel Dreyer of the University of Miami writing in Pacific Affairs, recommended the book and praised the arguments, but also said the author sometimes too willingly accepted China's rhetoric as truth. Xiaoyuan Liu, writing in International Affairs, called the book "Carefully researched and highly illuminating."

== See also ==
- Protest and dissent in China
