= Chinese information operations and information warfare =

The People's Republic of China (PRC) engages in information warfare through the People's Liberation Army (PLA) and other organizations affiliated or controlled by the Chinese Communist Party (CCP). Laid out in the Chinese Defence White Paper of 2008, informatized warfare includes the utilization of information-based weapons and forces, including battlefield management systems, precision-strike capabilities, and technology-assisted command and control (C4ISR). The term also refers to propaganda and influence operations efforts by the Chinese state. Consequential Chinese information operations have been carried out to influence Taiwanese sovereignty, U.S. elections, and the Russian invasion of Ukraine. China has also exploited artificial intelligence and increasingly complex communications structures to enhance its cyber-warfare capabilities.

== Definitions ==
China's military authority, the Central Military Commission, aimed to transform the People's Liberation Army (PLA) from conducting a "people's war" to engaging in warfare conditions of informatization, which includes moving the military doctrine from weapon platform-centric to cyber-centric. This may include algorithmically generated narratives, AI-coordinated social media accounts, and targeted attacks on communications infrastructure. The indicated characteristic of the cyber-centric force is the utilization of network linkages (data-link) among platforms.

Eric C. Anderson and Jeffrey G. Engstrom define "informationization" and informatized warfare in Chinese military doctrine as follows: "[A]t the operational level appears focused on providing an integrated platform for joint war-zone command, control, communications, computer, intelligence, surveillance, and reconnaissance (C4ISR) connectivity, and for peacetime command and control (C2) within the PLA's Military Regions."

The United States Defense Intelligence Agency (DIA) defines China's "informatized warfare" as similar to the U.S. military's concept of net-centric capability, which means the military's capability to use advanced information technology and communications systems to gain operational advantage over an adversary.

In 1995, Major General Wang Pufeng wrote: "Information war is a crucial stage of high-tech war... At its heart are information technologies, fusing intelligence war, strategic war, electronic war, guided missile war, a war of 'motorization' [jidong zhan], a war of firepower [huoli]—a total war. It is a new type of warfare."

In two articles in the People's Liberation Army Daily, of 13 and 20 June 1995, Senior Colonel Wang Baocun and Li Fei of the PLA Academy of Military Science noted several definitions. They concluded:

We hold that information warfare has both narrow and broad meanings. Information warfare in the narrow sense refers to the U.S. military's so-called "battlefield information warfare," the crux of which is "command and control warfare." It is defined as the comprehensive use, with intelligence support, of military deception, operational secrecy, psychological warfare, electronic warfare, and substantive destruction to assault the enemy's whole information system including personnel; and to disrupt the enemy's information flow, in order to impact, weaken, and destroy the enemy's command and control capability, while keeping one's own command and control capability from being affected by similar enemy actions.

They went on to state:

The essential substance of information warfare in the narrow sense is made up of five major elements and two general areas.

The five major elements are:

- Substantive destruction, the use of hard weapons to destroy enemy headquarters, command posts, and command and control (C2) information centers
- Electronic warfare, the use of electronic means of jamming or the use of antiradiation [electromagnetic] weapons to attack enemy information and intelligence collection systems such as communications and radar
- Military deception, the use of operations such as tactical feints [simulated attacks] to shield or deceive enemy intelligence collection systems
- Operational secrecy, the use of all means to maintain secrecy and keep the enemy from collecting intelligence on our operations
- Psychological warfare, the use of TV, radio, and leaflets to undermine the enemy's military morale.

The two general areas are information protection (defense) and information attack (offense):

- Information defense means preventing the destruction of one's own information systems, ensuring that these systems can perform their normal functions. In future wars, key information and information systems will become "combat priorities," the key targets of enemy attack.
- Information offense means attacking enemy information systems. Its aims are: destroying or jamming enemy information sources, to undermine or weaken enemy C&C capability, and cutting off the enemy's whole operational system. The key targets of information offense are the enemy's combat command, control and coordination, intelligence, and global information systems. A successful information offensive requires three prerequisites:
  - 1) the capability to understand the enemy's information systems, and the establishment of a corresponding database system;
  - 2) diverse and effective means of attack; and
  - 3) the capability to make battle damage assessments [BDA] of attacked targets.

— Senior Colonel Wang Baocun and Li Fei of the Academy of Military Science, Beijing, 1995.

A July 1998 conference held in San Diego, California, sponsored jointly by the RAND Center for Asia-Pacific Policy and the Taiwan-based Chinese Council of Advanced Policy Studies, brought together Chinese military analysts to discuss the "software" side of the PLA's modernization, including information warfare (IW). In his presentation, James C. Mulvenon stated: "Chinese writings clearly suggest that IW is a solely military subject, and as such, they draw inspiration primarily from U.S. military writings. The net result of this 'borrowing' is that many PLA authors' definitions of IW and IW concepts sound eerily familiar."

In December 1999, Xie Guang, the then Vice Minister of Science & Technology and Industry for National Defence, defined IW as:

IW in military sense means overall use of various types (of) information technologies, equipment and systems, particularly his command systems, to shake determination of enemy's policy makers and at the same time, the use of all the means possible to ensure that that one's own systems are not damaged or disturbed.

In a strategic analysis paper for the Indian Institute for Defence Studies and Analyses written in 2006, Vinod Anand examines the definitions of Chinese Information Warfare. He notes that although Chinese understanding of IW was initially based on western concepts, it has increasingly moved towards evolving its own orientation.

== Background and characteristics ==
China's interest in information warfare began after the United States victory in the first Gulf War (1990–1991). U.S. success was the result of information technology and the total dominance it achieved in the battle space. From that point forward, the PLA began to seriously invest in and develop its own concepts of information warfare and what they mean to China.

As a result of technological advancement, China has now entered an era where informationization can be applied to military domains.

China's 2004 White Paper on National Defense outlines the importance of informationization.

The PLA, aiming at building an informationalised force and winning an information war, deepens its reforms, dedicates itself to innovation, improves its quality and actively pushes forward the [Revolution in Military Affairs] with Chinese characteristics with informationalization at its core.

According to the U.S. Department of Defense's 2009 Annual Report to Congress on "Military Power of the People's Republic of China", the PLA at the time was preparing for what it called "local wars under conditions of informationization": high intensity and short duration fighting against high technology adversaries along the periphery of its territory. Additionally, local war under informationization is an effort which seeks to fully develop and link land, air, sea, space and the electromagnetic spectrum into one system. China's military strategy is focused on fighting and winning "informationized local wars."

China's leadership has continuously stressed using asymmetric techniques to counter more powerful nations, such as the United States, and information warfare is a tool that the PLA uses to achieve their goals. In a 2001 paper in the U.S. Military Review, Timothy L. Thomas examined the writings of Major General Dai Qingmin (Director of the PLA's Communications Department of the General Staff responsible for IW and IO), Senior Colonel Wang Baocun (of the PLA's Academy of Military Sciences) and others on the ways that China was employing "Electronic Strategies" to realise the benefits of asymmetric warfare. Thomas also summarised the April 2000 issue of the Chinese journal China Military Science which contains three articles on information warfare subjects. The only article written in English ("The Current Revolution in Military Affairs and its Impact on Asia-Pacific Security", by Senior Colonel Wang Baocun) presents a quite different approach to an article Wang Baocun wrote only three years previously where he presented a description of IW which contained the elements of Soviet/Russian military science.

In the article "On Information Warfare Strategies", by Major General Niu Li, Colonel Li Jiangzhou and Major Xu Dehui (of the Communications and Command Institute), the authors define IW stratagems as "schemes and methods devised and used by commanders and commanding bodies to seize and maintain information supremacy on the basis of using clever methods to prevail at a relatively small cost in information warfare."

In 2003, the CCP approved the three warfares strategy for the PLA, which involves using public opinion (or media) warfare, psychological warfare and legal warfare (lawfare).

While China has adopted the idea of information dominance, its method for going about information dominance differs, using ancient political warfare methods such as the Thirty-Six Stratagems. The PLA has also increasingly stressed an operational concept called "cognitive domain operations."

On the defensive side, China employs a combination of legal policies and information technology for censorship and surveillance of dissenters in a program called Golden Shield. This is often referred to as the Great Firewall of China. In response to the criticism of Internet censorship in China, CCP general secretary Xi Jinping has called for the avoidance of "cyber hegemony", stating that countries should respect each other's national security in cyberspace, a notion that China's officials have described as the country's right to "national cyber sovereignty".

== Information operations ==
The PLA began developing social media influence operations in the mid-2010s and began employing them since at least 2018, according to RAND Corporation. Pro-China disinformation campaigns in 2021 showed greater sophistication compared to 2019. It has been difficult to attribute with certainty whether Chinese state actors are behind these actions.

=== COVID-19 ===
Disinformation campaigns sought to downplay the emergence of COVID-19 in China and manipulate information about its spread around the world. In 2020, the Chinese government created a social media campaign in response to online civilian outrage at the COVID-19 pandemic. A look at Chinese controlled media would show how the government reportedly was able to efficiently contain the spread of the virus. The Chinese government took measures such as silencing Li Wenliang, the "whistleblower" doctor, and many other journalists in order to maintain this image.

In January 2023, Google stated that it shut down more than 50,000 accounts promoting disinformation about COVID-19, Taiwan, and U.S. politics. The campaign is believed to be linked to Chinese public relations firm Shanghai Haixun Technology Co. Haixun has planted pro-Beijing stories in dozens of American news outlets online.

=== Taiwan ===
The PRC seeks unification with Taiwan and uses information operations, sometimes referred to as "information war", as an important part of that work. Despite the large resource outlay, the Chinese have been relatively ineffective in influencing the Taiwanese public. According to James C. Mulvenon, rather than risk failure of a militarily forced unification, which could lead to international recognition of the independence of Taiwan, PRC leadership could potentially use computer network operations to undermine the will of Taiwan by attacking Taiwanese infrastructure.

In 2019, the PRC paid at least five Taiwanese media outlets to publish content promoting Beijing's narratives as part of its unification agenda. In one Taipei-based newspaper, these articles appeared as regular news reports, but they were in fact paid for by the PRC's Taiwan Affairs Office.

In 2022, Taiwan's Ministry of Justice Investigation Bureau revealed that it had identified more than 400 social media accounts being used to push disinformation to Taiwanese citizens as part of Chinese content farms. In 2023, the Investigation Bureau announced that it was monitoring for money laundering undertaken in an effort to finance election interference in Taiwan.

In Taiwan, in December 2023, false information claiming that "Taiwan will introduce 100,000 Indian workers" spread on Dcard, leading to protest gatherings primarily among young people. The post linked the acceptance of foreign workers to an increase in sexual violence incidents, causing social unrest. According to analysis by the Taiwan-based research group Double Think Lab, the post included linguistic expressions not typical of Taiwan, suggesting the possibility of cognitive warfare from China.

In February 2024, leaked internal documents from the Shanghai-based private company iSoon revealed that Chinese public security and military agencies were conducting cyberattacks against foreign governments and companies by exploiting vulnerabilities in U.S. software. From Taiwan, personal information as well as three-dimensional data of roads and buildings were illicitly obtained, and the server of National Chengchi University was also potentially targeted.

During the 2022 Chinese military exercises around Taiwan, Taiwanese officials accused the PLA of engaging in information warfare with claims of military exercises close to Penghu.

During the 2024 Taiwan election, the PRC disseminated US skepticism disinformation that cast doubt on the reliability of the United States in an effort to undermine U.S.-Taiwan relations and sway the Taiwanese public toward China instead.

In August 2026, Taiwanese officials said the CCP had tried to take control of pro-Taiwan groups overseas by removing their leaders and replacing them with people loyal to Beijing. They also said Chinese actors collected information about group members and spread deepfake videos accusing OCAC Minister Hsu Chia-ching of misusing public funds and the videos were meant to discourage the council from working with Taiwanese communities abroad.

=== United States ===
The Chinese Communist Party (CCP) has been carrying out propaganda against the West since the 1960s, spreading its ideology and creating division among the population. Its foreign-directed propaganda has been known to back far-left political activists and radical feminism.

Using a variety of methods, the PRC has recruited American agents of influence to advocate for Chinese interests in the United States. While many of these agents of influence serve China unwittingly, they can be very effective. A 1999 Congressional report found that "the Chinese Government continues to seek influence in Congress through various means, including inviting Congressional members to visit the PRC, lobbying ethnic Chinese voters and prominent U.S. citizens, and engaging U.S. business interests to weigh in on issues of mutual concern."

China also uses its vast market as leverage in order to persuade American companies to lobby for Chinese interests. This is especially true of companies that deal in high technology or dual-use technology, as there are significant export controls placed on such technology. According to the 1999 Cox Report, "Executives wishing to do business in the PRC share a mutual commercial interest with the PRC in minimizing export controls on dual-use and military-related technologies. The PRC has displayed a willingness to exploit this mutuality of interest in several notoriously public cases by inducing VIPs from large U.S. companies to lobby on behalf of initiatives, such as export liberalization, on which they are aligned with the PRC."

Chinese government information operations have also attempted to co-opt local NIMBY sentiment to drive opposition against perceived economic threats such as the development projects that compete with the rare earth industry in China.

In 2024 Network Contagion reported that several member organizations of the pro-Palestinian movement Shut It Down for Palestine (SID4P) are linked to what it calls the "Singham Network" under Neville Roy Singham, who has close ties to the CCP according to Network Contagion. The report accuses the Singham Network of stoking unrest at the grassroot level and amplifying the voice of SID4P and says that at least one member of SID4P has ties to extremist groups with anti-American, anti-Israel, and anti-Jewish agendas.

==== U.S. elections ====
Through its agents in America, the PRC has financed a number of political candidates. Katrina Leung, a Chinese spy, contributed $10,000 to the campaign of Richard Riordan, the former mayor of Los Angeles. When he lost his primary to Bill Simon Jr., Leung contributed $4,200 to Simon's campaign. At the direction of her Chinese handlers, Leung also contributed to the 1992 campaign of George H. W. Bush. It is estimated that Leung donated around $27,000 to politicians in the 1990s on behalf of the PRC.

A 2012 report by the Government Accountability Institute cites other examples: It was discovered that officers from the Chinese Embassy in Washington, D.C. "sought to direct contributions from foreign sources to the Democratic National Committee before the 1996 presidential campaign." While these allegations have been denied by the PRC, "Secret communications between Beijing and the Chinese Embassy in Washington establish that the influence-buying plan was 'government sanctioned...'"

In 1996, People's Liberation Army intelligence officer Gen. Ji Shengde provided Johnny Chung, a fundraiser for the Democratic National Committee, with $300,000 to donate towards President Bill Clinton's reelection. Chung visited the White House over fifty times during the 1996 presidential campaign, and was responsible for over $400,000 of contributions to the DNC.

In September 2022, Meta Platforms removed fake accounts linked to a China-based influence operation ahead of the 2022 United States elections. In the run-up to the 2024 United States elections, the Ministry of Public Security's Spamouflage influence operation was identified as having used fake social media accounts in an attempt to amplify divisions in US society.

==== Commercial and corporate targeting ====
In 2024, the social network analysis firm Graphika identified a sub-network of the pro-PRC campaign Spamouflage, which they dubbed "Glass Onion." This operation specifically targeted the U.S. commercial sector, attempting to frame American corporations as corrupt and negligent. The campaign utilized accounts that had previously posted spam content (such as pornography or commercial advertising) before pivoting to political messaging.

The operation impersonated U.S. citizens, including military veterans and environmentalists, to attack companies such as Boeing, Pfizer, and Moderna. For example, following safety incidents involving Boeing aircraft, the network amplified narratives suggesting the company prioritized profit over safety, utilizing cartoons and AI-generated imagery. The report noted that while the network struggled to generate organic engagement, it demonstrated an evolution in tactics by focusing on specific U.S. industries to exploit existing public grievances.

=== Israel ===
In September 2025, Israeli Prime Minister Benjamin Netanyahu accused China, along with Qatar of orchestrating and leading a propaganda campaign to politically "besiege" Israel by undermining its global support, particularly in Western media and among allies.

=== Japan ===
==== ALPS-treated water from the Fukushima Daiichi Nuclear Power Plant ====
It has been pointed out that China has conducted cognitive warfare regarding the discharge of Fukushima Daiichi Nuclear Power Plant' ALPS-treated water into the ocean. As a reason, Kohei Watanabe, a former Japan Air Self-Defense Force member and Fukushima Prefectural Assembly member, cites that "Chinese fishing vessels continue to fish for mackerel and other species in the North Pacific off Fukushima and Hokkaido even after the start of treated water discharge, creating a contradictory situation where Japanese vessels fishing in the same waters are banned from distributing 'Japanese-origin' products domestically, while 'Chinese-origin' products are allowed". Furthermore, fake posts giving the impression of "treated water spreading in the sea" (Note: These used simulations unrelated to treated water.) were circulated, originating from X accounts mentioned in leaked documents about Chinese information operations, and the spread involved the use of numerous bot accounts.

==== Ryukyu independence movement ====
Since the 2020s, the Chinese Communist Party (CCP) has intensified its diplomatic and information influence operations targeting the Okinawa Prefecture and the Ryukyu independence movement. While these may be efforts to shake or divide Japan or manipulate domestic Chinese public opinion, Kazuki Ichida notes that many analysts also interpret them as potentially part of activities aiming at the annexation of Taiwan.

Fake news has also been confirmed. A website run by a Chinese PR company used the name of Yasukatsu Matsushima—a proponent of the Ryukyu independence movement—to fabricate statements and extreme expressions not made by him, publishing articles intended to provoke conflict.

Following remarks by Prime Minister Sanae Takaichi concerning the security situation surrounding Taiwan in November 2025, misinformation related to Ryukyu (Okinawa) reportedly increased significantly on social media both within and outside Japan. Claims such as "Ryukyu seeks independence" and "Ryukyu is not part of Japan" circulated widely.

One method of dissemination involved altering Japanese lifestyle videos by adding Chinese-language subtitles and falsely identifying the speakers as being "from Ryukyu." Some of these videos further asserted that Ryukyu, Taiwan, and the Senkaku Islands belong to China, and several accounts sharing such content gained notable influence on Chinese social media platforms.

The spread of pro-independence narratives was not limited to Japanese-language spaces. English-language posts containing phrases such as "Ryukyu is not Japan" and "Free Ryukyu" also circulated, with some reportedly linked to or amplified by Chinese-language sources. While many posts cited the historical existence of the Ryukyu Kingdom to support independence claims, counterarguments from Japanese sources and explanatory material regarding historical context were comparatively less visible in English-language media.

==== Cognitive warfare in Hong Kong exploiting Japanese aversion to demonstrations ====
In Japan, it has become clear that pro-Chinese government narratives regarding the 2019–2020 Hong Kong protests have been widely accepted and disseminated across the eological left and right. In particular, the right tends to negatively interpret the Hong Kong protests by associating them with domestic leftist demonstrations (e.g., SEALDs), which facilitates the acceptance of pro-China narratives. Moreover, Japanese aversion to demonstrations has been shown to create a vulnerability in interpreting foreign democratization movements from an authoritarian perspective.

In an online experiment, Japanese adults were measured for their degree of "aversion to demonstrations," and then presented with a pro-China narrative ("Hong Kong protests were riots instigated by the CIA") and a mainstream narrative ("Hong Kong protests were social movements seeking freedom and democracy"). The results showed that those with strong aversion to demonstrations were more likely to accept the pro-China narrative, with little influence from the mainstream narrative. Conversely, those with weaker aversion to demonstrations tended to accept the mainstream narrative as well.

This suggests that the uniquely Japanese "aversion to demonstrations" can be a vulnerability to propaganda from authoritarian countries, distorting the understanding of democratization movements and aiding the spread of authoritarian narratives. It also shows that participatory propaganda from authoritarian states is not necessarily divisive and may be accepted beyond ideological lines.

=== Philippines ===
In 2025, journalists reported that the Chinese Embassy in the Philippines had allegedly contracted a Makati-based marketing firm, InfinitUs Marketing Solutions—whose five executives reportedly include two Chinese nationals—to operate inauthentic social media accounts amid tensions over the West Philippine Sea. Leaked internal documents indicated that the operation involved roughly 300 Facebook accounts and 30 X accounts, managed by a team of operatives using fabricated online personas to disseminate pro-China messaging, defend Chinese actions, and criticize Philippine officials and the United States–Philippines alliance, with the stated goal to "change the overall negative perception of Filipinos about the Chinese and China."

==== Influence operations on the Chinese Filipino community ====
In a March 21, 2026 forum, global security expert Ray Powell of the Sealight Foundation alleged of influence operations on the Chinese Filipino community. He mentioned a directive from the Chinese embassy urging the Chinese Filipino media outlets to "cooperate closely with the embassy, and carry forward patriotism and love for the homeland". According to Powell, this "homeland" was not the Philippines. He also claimed that 5,000 mainland Chinese teachers had been sent to Chinese Filipino schools in the country. According to Powell, it was part of the "blood transfusion plan" being carried out by the "Philippine Chinese Education Research Center". He clarified that their research only aimed to prevent the "hostile foreign state" from taking over and exploiting these Chinese Filipino institutions and is not meant to target the Chinese Filipino community as a whole.

=== Russian invasion of Ukraine ===
During the Russian invasion of Ukraine, state news agency Xinhua and other Chinese state media outlets paid for digital ads on Facebook amplifying pro-Kremlin disinformation and propaganda after Meta Platforms banned Russian state media advertisement buys. In March 2022, China Global Television Network repeated unsubstantiated Russian claims of biological weapons labs in Ukraine. The CCP-owned tabloid Global Times also echoed Russian state media claims that the Bucha massacre was staged.

The Taiwanese Doublethink Lab assessed that Chinese disinformation networks had actively recycled Russian disinformation related to the war and that Chinese censors had even temporarily backed off on restrictions to enable these operations. For example, removing filters around "Nazis" to allow Russian disinformation focusing on the ties of Ukrainian units to Nazis and/or Neo-Nazis.

=== 2017 China–India border standoff ===
The Times of India reported that during the 2017 Doklam standoff China used information operations against India. Chinese state media asserted that the People's Liberation Army was preparing for combat by shifting substantial quantities of hardware and vehicles closer to Tibet's Sikkim frontier. Indian officials, however, maintained that there had been no unsettling troop movements south of the Tsangpo River in Tibet. Many analysts saw Beijing's reports as a deliberate psychological tactic designed to compel New Delhi to withdraw its forces from the Doklam Plateau in Bhutanese territory, where soldiers from both sides had remained locked in a tense standoff for over a month.

=== Other regions ===
==== Southeast Asia ====
In 2020, Facebook took down a network of inauthentic accounts that, according to Graphika, were attributed to individuals in China. The information campaign focused on politics in Southeast Asia and was dubbed "Operation Naval Gazing" by security researchers.

=== Other platforms ===
==== Social media ====
In June 2020, Twitter shut down 23,750 primary accounts and approximately 150,000 booster accounts which were being used by China to conduct an information operation aimed at boosting China's global position during the COVID-19 outbreak as well as attacking traditional targets such as Hong Kong pro-democracy activists, Guo Wengui, and Taiwan. Twitter said that the accounts had pushed deceptive narratives and spread propaganda.

In 2020 Google removed over 2,500 YouTube accounts linked to China. Most of them uploaded spam-like content unrelated to politics, but a subset posted content primarily in Chinese about COVID-19 and racial protests in the United States.

==== Websites ====
Chinese influence operations have been also observed as making use of large networks of websites mimicking local news outlets. In 2022, the cybersecurity company Mandiant first exposed a network injecting pro-Chinese narratives into American news outlets, and even commissioning a live protest in Washington, D.C.

In February 2024, researchers at the Citizen Lab discovered an even larger set of websites posing as local news, and inserting targeted attacks on individuals and organizations critical of the Chinese government into much larger volumes of content stolen from real local news outlets. The network, dubbed PAPERWALL, remains active as of 2025, despite achieving virtually no traffic according to the researchers.

==== U.S. media outlets ====
PRC diplomats have appeared on U.S. television and radio programs at CNN, CBS, and NPR, disseminating their messages to millions of viewers and listeners. Their op-eds have also been published at media outlets such as The New York Times, The Washington Post, and Bloomberg.

PRC state media reaches Americans directly with its own content in print and online through paid inserts in media outlets such as The New York Times, The Wall Street Journal, The Washington Post, TIME, Foreign Policy, USA Today, Financial Times, and Los Angeles Times. There are concerns that, although the PRC state media inserts are treated as advertisements by these U.S. media, Americans are left to recognize the inserts as state-sponsored propaganda.

Major Chinese companies with close ties to the CCP, such as Huawei, also engage in paid and unpaid content dissemination through U.S. media outlets. While the company's sponsorship is disclosed, its government ties are not always apparent to readers. According to the Australian Strategic Policy Institute, major Chinese tech companies, including Huawei, established CCP branches or committees, with Huawei's CCP members reaching 12,000 in 2007.

=== Artificial intelligence ===
Emerging artificial intelligence (AI) models are quickly becoming an important part of states' military and information strategies around the world. AI enables a more rapid production of content, targeted messaging, and user analysis - processes critical for effective disinformation campaigns. As a result, AI models shorten the cycle of propaganda dissemination, allowing state actors to more quickly exploit vulnerabilities in other states' information infrastructure. AI capabilities are an increasingly significant factor in the effectiveness of influence operations carried out by major power states (i.e. Russia, the United States, and China).

AI is already integrated into many of the processes of information warfare. The Chinese government has harnessed generative AI to automate the creation of deceptive content including deep fake videos and synthetic news articles. This information is disseminated by a large network of state-controlled social media accounts that pose as authentic users. These CCP-linked accounts are also controlled and managed by AI. Generative AI is used in this way to conduct online influence operations for both overt propaganda and covert psychological operations. Throughout this process, the CCP employs AI to continuously refine its messaging, ensuring that disinformation efforts adapt to foreign countermeasures while continuing to align with domestic CCP narratives. AI not only amplifies China's ability to shape public opinion at home and abroad but also poses significant challenges to adversaries attempting to counteract these influence campaigns.

In June 2026, OpenAI shut down a cluster of China-based accounts using ChatGPT to engage in "covert influence operations" to "gain a strategic advantage in AI development" by amplifying division in the United States regarding data center development.

In August 2026, The New York Times reported that AI developed in China is being used to help the CCP spread its propaganda and promote Beijing's views while limiting information it considers unfavorable.

=== Comparison to U.S. information operations ===
The PRC's information warfare strategies, such as the PLA's three warfares doctrine, draw partial inspiration from Sun Tzu's The Art of War, with its three pillars—psychological warfare, public opinion warfare, and legal warfare—closely aligned with Sun Tzu's principle of subduing the enemy without fighting.

China's approach places strong emphasis on shaping international narratives—particularly through narrative warfare that invokes historical claims in East Asia. At the same time, the PRC also prioritizes managing domestic narratives and maintaining internal order and stability. China has not only launched domestic campaigns to bolster nationalism among its citizens, but also employs a robust surveillance and censorship apparatus to suppress dissent within its borders.

As for the United States, information operations encompass a broad range of supporting activities, including electronic warfare (EW), computer network operations (CNO), psychological operations (PSYOP), military deception (MILDEC), and operations security (OPSEC). As opposed to China, which treats information warfare as a core part of their military strategy, the U.S. views information operations primarily as a supporting element integrated within broader conventional military operations. Further, U.S. strategy is rather decentralized, with these responsibilities spread across agencies like the Department of Defense, State Department, and intelligence community. In contrast, PLA doctrine emphasizes centralized command and control under a unified structure which integrates the political, military, and civilian spheres.

Unlike China, which places an emphasis on employing information operations domestically, the U.S. employs a primarily outward facing approach, with little domestic narrative control due to legal and constitutional constraints, including the Smith-Mundt Act and First Amendment protections. The U.S. targets foreign influence through efforts like the Global Engagement Center, which counters disinformation campaigns from Russia and China. This center has also worked to safeguard elections from foreign interference, with Microsoft reporting attempts by Iranian, Chinese, and Russian actors to disrupt U.S. elections. On the offensive side, U.S. information operations are primarily used to deceive and subdue the enemy. Historically, this has entailed using techniques such as inflatable vehicles, false radio transmissions, airborne leaflets, and sound effects. More recently, the U.S. has conducted operations like Operation Glowing Symphony (2016–2018), where Cyber Command hacked and disrupted ISIS's online platforms to erase digital propaganda and block recruitment efforts.

=== Cyber offensive capabilities ===
In recent years, China has developed a sophisticated set of cyber capabilities as part of their information warfare strategy. The People's Liberation Army (PLA) and state-backed units have devoted significant resources to developing resources to be prepared for future geopolitical conflicts. China's cyber information warfare takes a unique approach that blends novel strategies with entrepreneurship. The government is able to work with technology firms like Huawei to support their cyber initiatives. Huawei's global presence would allow China to centralize a significant amount of communication data. This partnership allows state agencies to leverage new artificial intelligence and surveillance tools while countries like the United States still keep a firm boundary between the public and private sector. Non-state actors' transparent relationship with the government has allowed for numerous advantages in conflicts with foreign powers.

One recent example that illustrates their capabilities was a cyber campaign known as Volt Typhoon. The campaign has gained access to key areas of critical United States infrastructure including power grids and communication networks. Unlike information warfare tactics that disrupt operations temporarily, Volt Typhoon focused on long term pre-positioning for leverage in future conflicts. By proxying its traffic through compromised devices, Volt Typhoon is able to obtain credentials and maintain unauthorized access by blending in. This shift towards a long term focus in China's information warfare strategy enables them to have significant control over communications infrastructure in future key scenarios. China's emphasis on pre-positioning reflects a broader strategy of maintaining covert access to provide a strategic advantage in the right time.

=== Infrastructure ===
==== Economic espionage ====
In mid September 2024, the Committee on Homeland Security investigated rising threats to U.S. economic and homeland security posed by the Chinese Communist Party (CCP), particularly through its control over maritime infrastructure.

In particular, the investigation highlighted the dominance of a state-owned logistics corporation managed by the Chinese government, Shanghai Zhenhua Heavy Industries (ZPMC) that controls nearly 80 percent of the cranes operating at U.S. ports.

In a statement from the Committee on Homeland Security website:

The evidence gathered during our joint investigation indicates that ZPMC could, if desired, serve as a Trojan horse capable of helping the CCP and the PRC military exploit and manipulate U.S. maritime equipment and technology at their request. This vulnerability in our critical infrastructure has the potential to affect Americans from coast to coast.

ZPMC has repeatedly requested remote access to its cranes at various U.S. ports, particularly those on the West Coast. If granted, this access could be extended to other PRC government entities, as China's national security laws require full cooperation. ZPMC's ascent to dominance is a direct result of strategic leveraging of cheap labor and steel to sell cranes at below market prices.

==== Rising concerns ====
The U.S.-China Economic and Security Review Commission is a legislative commission that prioritizes the assessment and monitoring of US- China economic relations. In 2022, the commission documented the expansion of China's influence beyond "the physical domains of land, air, and sea into cyberspace, the electromagnetic spectrum" and more. The commission also noted the potential for state sponsored cyber actors to utilize logistics infrastructure as potential targets.

In 2024, the Center for Strategic and International Studies, an American think tank, outlined major strategic risks associated with PRC control over global infrastructure. According to the report, PRC entities could gain access to sensitive data including the type, quantity and origin of a good among other characteristics. This intelligence would provide insights into global trade patterns allowing for potential modifications by Chinese governmental agencies.

== See also ==
- Chinese intelligence activity abroad
- List of cyber warfare forces
- Transnational repression by China
- State-sponsored Internet propaganda

== Bibliography ==
- Mulvenon, James (1999). "The PLA and Information Warfare". In Mulvenon, James C.; Yang, Richard H. (eds.). The People's Liberation Army in the Information Age. RAND Corporation. doi:10.7249/cf145. ISBN 978-0-8330-2716-0.
