= Lawfare =

Weaponization of legal systems

Lawfare is the use of legal systems and institutions to affect foreign or domestic affairs, as a more peaceful and rational alternative, or as a less benign adjunct, to warfare.

Detractors have alternately begun to define the term as, "An attempt to damage or delegitimize an opponent, or to deter an individual's usage of their legal rights". The term may refer to the use of legal systems and principles against an enemy, such as by damaging or delegitimizing them, wasting their time, energy, and money (e.g., by bringing strategic lawsuits against public participation, or SLAPP), or winning a public relations victory. Alternatively, it may describe a tactic used by repressive regimes to label and discourage civil society or individuals from claiming their legal rights via national or international legal systems. This is especially common in situations when individuals and civil society use nonviolent methods to highlight or oppose discrimination, persecution, corruption, lack of democracy, limitations of freedom of speech, violations of human rights, and violations of international humanitarian law.

Since the early 2000s, the use of legal mechanisms in conflict contexts has drawn significant international attention. During this period, particularly in the context of the U.S.-led "war on terror", both the United States and Israel have characterized legal challenges to their military operations as a form of lawfare—a term used to describe the perceived exploitation of legal systems to achieve political or ideological objectives. Critics argue that this framing delegitimizes the legal efforts of less powerful actors who seek accountability through international institutions. China has also employed lawfare, to advance its geopolitical objectives and repress dissidents abroad.

== Early use and definitions ==
The term is a portmanteau of the words "law" and "warfare". The first documented use of the term "lawfare" was in a 1957 article regarding divorce, which states that "[t]he canton, clearly reduced in status, still is a state with standing in court to wage some lawfare on behalf of its folk, and with liability for some behavior of its folk."

The term reappeared at the turn of the century, first in a 2001 article by the anthropologist John Comaroff, who employed it to denote "the effort to conquer and control indigenous peoples by the coercive use of legal means." In his later work, the definition of the concept was broadened to encompass, more generally, "the resort to legal instruments, to the violence inherent in the law, to commit acts of political coercion, even erasure."

A more frequently cited use of the term is found in a 2001 essay authored by Major General Charles J. Dunlap Jr., in which Dunlap defines lawfare as "the use of law as a weapon of war"; that is, "a method of warfare where law is used as a means of realizing a military objective". He later expanded on the definition, describing lawfare as "the exploitation of real, perceived, or even orchestrated incidents of law-of-war violations being employed as an unconventional means of confronting" a superior military power. In this sense, lawfare may be a more humane substitute for military conflict, although Dunlap considers lawfare a "cynical manipulation of the rule of law and the humanitarian values it represents".

Benjamin Wittes, Robert Chesney, and Jack Goldsmith employ the word in the name of the Lawfare website, which focuses on national security law and has explored the debate over the definition of lawfare and whether it should be considered exclusively a pejorative.

Recent scholarship has included non-judicial tactics in lawfare such as using legal systems and processes to achieve strategic goals outside of traditional courtroom battles. Orde Kittrie, in Lawfare: Law as a Weapon of War (2016), describes compliance‑leverage lawfare as exploiting legal compliance gaps to pressure adversaries. Challenging the charitable status of adversary organizations is also described as an example of lawfare.

== Universal jurisdiction ==
Lawfare may involve the law of a nation turned against its own officials, but more recently it has been associated with the spread of universal jurisdiction, that is, one nation or an international organization hosted by that nation reaching out to seize and prosecute officials of another.

== Examples ==
=== Hundred Years' War ===
According to historians Iskander Rehman and David Green, French officials deployed a form of lawfare in the lead-up to the Hundred Years' War. Rehman states:

In the fraught decades leading up the Hundred Years War, French officials deployed their expertise in the arcane intricacies of feudal law to continuously undermine Plantagenet (English) authority over their continental territories, 'clogging up administrative processes', 'interfering with fiscal activities' and burying English officials under a deluge of legal cases.

— Iskander Rehman, Planning for Protraction

=== United States and Iran ===
United States sanctions against Iran since the 1980s have been described as a form of financial lawfare. They were levied citing Iran's link to terrorism as well as a way to disrupt its nuclear program, costing tens of billions to the country's economy and foreign banks doing business with it.

=== Guantanamo Bay detention camp ===
During the war on terror, reports of prisoner abuse at Guantanamo Bay and debates about the legality of their detention led to actions that have been described as a form of lawfare or even "war" against the United States.

=== China ===
The government of the People's Republic of China has recognized lawfare (Chinese: 法律战; pinyin: Fǎlǜ zhàn; lit. 'legal warfare') as an essential component of its strategic doctrine. Lawfare is part of the People's Liberation Army (PLA)'s "three warfares" doctrine approved by the Chinese Communist Party (CCP) for guiding its political warfare and information influence operations.

Examples cited as lawfare include the PRC's activities in the East China Sea, South China Sea, and legal actions regarding Taiwan. In 2013, the PRC created an Air Defense Identification Zone that covers the disputed Senkaku Islands. It has issued official notes verbales and enacted laws to assert sovereignty or effective control over disputed portions of the South China Sea. The PRC has attempted to frame cross-strait relations as an internal dispute, attempted to apply its 2005 Anti-Secession Law to Taiwan and make its One China principle a matter of international law. The PRC has enacted laws against supporters of Taiwanese independence, regardless of their location, and issued bounties for Taiwanese military personnel as well as Taiwanese YouTubers. The PRC and its proxies have also filed Interpol notices and suits in foreign courts to repress dissidents abroad. Defamation lawsuits against foreign publications criticizing China or its companies have been described as lawfare.

=== Israeli–Palestinian conflict ===
Both pro-Israeli groups and pro-Palestinian groups have been accused of using lawfare against one another. In Israel and some US states, the Boycott, Divestment and Sanctions (BDS) movement has been met with anti-BDS laws. In 2011, Israeli group Shurat HaDin prevented some ships in a Gaza-bound flotilla from leaving Greece by warning several companies involved that they could face legal charges. Many cases have been brought forward against Israeli officials and those associated with the Israel Defense Forces (IDF), accusing them of war crimes. They have been heard in Israel and other countries. According to Canadian lawmaker and former minister Irwin Cotler, the use of law to delegitimize Israel is present in five areas: United Nations, international law, humanitarian law, the struggle against racism, and the struggle against genocide.

Israeli officials have referred to Palestinian initiatives at the United Nations Human Rights Council, the International Criminal Court (ICC), and the United Nations Security Council as examples of political and legal warfare. U.S. Secretary of State Marco Rubio has referred to the ICC as an "instrument of lawfare." NGO Monitor, a pro-Israel organization, has argued that certain non-governmental organizations (NGOs) such as the Center for Constitutional Rights and Defense for Children International – Palestine are promoting legal actions that challenge Israeli policies.

In 2017, Christian Aid, a British NGO, was sued in the United States by the director of the Zionist Advocacy Center for "providing material aid to Hamas". The case was dismissed by the courts, but the charity had spent £700,000 in defending itself. In 2019, the NATO Strategic Communications Centre of Excellence stated that the use of human shields by groups like Hamas as an example of lawfare hinging on exploiting civilian casualties and the sensitivity of Western public opinion. In 2024, the European Parliament expressed support for French-Palestinian politician Rima Hassan against what it described as "an attempt of lawfare intended to silence, intimidate and criminalise" critics of the Gaza war. According to international law experts, Israel's human shield accusations against Hamas are not substantiated and are intended as a rationalization for its destruction of Palestinian medical facilities.

=== Turkey ===
The government of Recep Tayyip Erdoğan and the Justice and Development Party (AKP) has been accused of using lawfare against political opponents. Legal scholar Cem Tecimer described the proceedings against Istanbul mayor Ekrem İmamoğlu as "textbook lawfare", arguing that numerous criminal, civil and administrative proceedings were being used simultaneously to overwhelm him and produce different means of excluding him from political competition.

Amnesty International has similarly described the prosecution of İmamoğlu as an example of the "weaponization" of Turkey's justice system. Earlier cases have involved the use of prolonged detention against opposition politicians and civil-society figures. In Selahattin Demirtaş v. Turkey (no. 2), the European Court of Human Rights (ECtHR) found that the detention of pro-Kurdish opposition leader Selahattin Demirtaş had pursued the ulterior purpose of "stifling pluralism and limiting freedom of political debate". In Kavala v. Turkey, the Court similarly found that the detention of civil-society activist Osman Kavala pursued the ulterior purpose of reducing him to silence.

Legal pressure intensified against the main opposition Republican People's Party (CHP) after its gains in the 2024 Turkish local elections. By July 2025, hundreds of CHP members and municipal employees, including 14 mayors, had been detained or jailed in investigations involving corruption, terrorism and other offences; the CHP and human-rights groups described the investigations as politically motivated, while the government maintained that the judiciary was independent. İmamoğlu's university diploma was annulled shortly before his March 2025 detention, potentially preventing him from meeting the constitutional educational requirement for the presidency; the Congress of Local and Regional Authorities described the sequence as a campaign of "judicial harassment" restricting his ability to stand for election. In May 2026, an appeals court also annulled the CHP congress that had elected Özgür Özel as party leader and reinstated his predecessor Kemal Kılıçdaroğlu, a ruling the CHP characterised as a "judicial coup".

== Commentary ==
Harvard School of Law professor Jack Goldsmith, an opponent to the expansion of international human rights and universal jurisdiction, states in his book The Terror Presidency that Defense Secretary Donald Rumsfeld was concerned with the possibility of lawfare waged against Bush administration officials, and that Rumsfeld "could expect to be on top of the list". Rumsfeld addresses the effects of lawfare in his memoir Known and Unknown.

During a panel discussion on lawfare at the 2024 Vancouver International Security Summit Panelist Cynthia Alkon, law professor and director of the Texas A&M University Criminal Law, Justice & Policy Program, and instructor of the first university class on lawfare in the United States at Texas A&M Law School said, "A lot of lawyers don't know they are in a case of lawfare." Alkon went on to described the primary form of lawfare as "a state acting through corporations and lawyers to file injunctions and lawsuits against investigative reporters, researchers, and security consultants warning against various forms of contentious action covertly taken by that state against others."

At the same 2024 Vancouver International Security Summit, Panelist Scott McGregor, a former military and RCMP intelligence official, cited his work as an author resulted in a defamation claim against him and his co-author, Ina Mitchell, by a group believed to be associated with the Chinese Communist Party (CCP). McGregor and Mitchell wrote about an unsolved 2020 murder of a Chinese national named Bo Fan. "In lawfare, there is an intention to suppress what you're saying, to deter," said McGregor, noting that the authors became a target of the CCP despite British Columbia's new law to prevent strategic litigation against public participation (SLAPP).

In a February 2026 ruling, British Columbia Supreme Court Justice David Layton explicitly characterized the defamation lawsuit against McGregor and Mitchell as lawfare designed to silence critical coverage of matters of significant public interest. Layton rejected claims of bias or malice with the journalists' work and upheld defense under British Columbia's Protection of Public Participation Act (PPPA), awarding full indemnity for legal costs, warning that such strategic litigation could chill future journalistic scrutiny despite existing anti-SLAPP safeguards.

== See also ==
- Justice delayed is justice denied
- Malicious prosecution
- Paper terrorism
- Political prisoner
- Vexatious litigation
- War as metaphor
