= Three warfares =

Chinese Communist Party political warfare doctrine

"Three warfares" (Chinese: 三战 or 三种战法, pinyin: Sān zhǒng zhàn fǎ; also translated as 'three tactics') is an official strategy of the People's Liberation Army (PLA) employing media or public opinion warfare, psychological warfare, and legal warfare (also termed lawfare). Promulgated as work regulations, the "three warfares" was set forth in the amended Political Work Regulations of the PLA in 2003.

== History ==
Three warfares is believed to be inspired by the Zhou dynasty strategist Sun Tzu's book The Art of War, particularly his notion of winning without fighting. Laura Jackson, an American China expert, said that three warfares aims at "undermining international institutions, changing borders, and subverting global media, all without firing a shot".

The doctrine was approved by the Central Committee of the Chinese Communist Party (CCP) and the Central Military Commission in December 2003 to guide PLA political and information operations. Chapter 2, Section 18 of the "Chinese People's Liberation Army Political Work Regulations" sets forth the three warfares, among other political tasks. The three warfares under "wartime political work" are public opinion warfare, psychological warfare, and legal warfare (also termed lawfare). Three warfares was integrated into PLA teaching programs. Operationally, PLA's General Political Department's Liaison Department (GPD/LD), China's Ministry of Foreign Affairs and United Front Work Department are organizations responsible for three warfares. China has incorporated three warfares into local governments and institutions.

These work regulations have been revised over time. Recent output from the PLA Academy of Military Science and the PLA National Defence University (NDU) builds on three warfares doctrine and expands its roles and methods; this includes texts such as the PLA Academy of Military Science's The Science of Military Strategy (2013), the NDU's "Introduction to Public Opinion Warfare, Psychological Warfare, and Legal Warfare" (2014), and NDU's "Science of Military Strategy" (2015).

During the formative years of China, political warfare was as much concerned with creating national identity and defeating domestic adversaries as it was with China's ability to compete in the world.

Establishing legal justifications prior to military conflict is not new. Since the formation of the People's Republic of China (PRC), casus belli have always been established before military action is taken as was seen in the case of the Korean War, the 1962 Sino-Indian War, the 1969 Sino-Soviet border conflict, and the 1979 Sino-Vietnamese War. Military action backed by domestic law strengthens PRC's position as is in the case of the usage of the 1992 Territorial Sea Laws in the South China Sea and the 2005 Anti-Secession Law in relation to Taiwan. This diplomatic tradition has now been combined with modern warfare. Psychological warfare has been one of the main responsibilities of the Political Work Department of the Central Military Commission (formerly the PLA's General Political Department or GPD) since the day it was established. Media or public opinion warfare combines traditional propaganda techniques with deception and perception management.

== Theory ==
For the PLA, legal warfare in the modern international context is a way to "expose the enemy", "publicize one's own humanitarianism ... win over the universal sympathy and support from the international community ... to compel [the] opponent to bog down in isolation and passivity" among other things. Psychological warfare, quoting PLA strategist Yu Guohua, "should sap the enemy's morale, disintegrate their will to fight, ignite the anti-war sentiment among citizens at home, heighten international and domestic conflict, weaken and sway the will to fight among its high level decision makers, and in turn lessen their superiority in military strength". One tactic of media warfare may be "to open for selective study the parts of the PLA that help deliver the message that the GPD and the Propaganda Department want delivered to foreign audiences while concealing other areas of PLA activity".

=== Foreign definitions ===
According to Abhijit Singh, a research fellow at Manohar Parrikar Institute for Defense Studies and Analyses (MP-IDSA), an Indian think tank, three warfares involves using public opinion (or media warfare) warfare, psychological warfare and legal warfare (lawfare) to "weaken its adversaries in regions constituting what it perceives to be its core interests" aimed at "creating conditions suitable for a resolution of the conflict on favourable terms to China without resorting to physical war" or conversely "to create the climate and context for the use of force". Public opinion or media warfare can include overt and covert media manipulation, while legal warfare or lawfare includes exploitation of national and international legal systems.

In 2011, the United States Department of Defense defined three warfares as follows:

1) Psychological Warfare – seeks to undermine an enemy's ability to conduct combat operations through operations aimed at deterring, shocking, and demoralising enemy military personnel and supporting civilian populations.

2) Media Warfare – is aimed at influencing domestic and international public opinion to build support for China's military actions and dissuade an adversary from pursuing actions contrary to China's interests.

3) Legal Warfare – uses international and domestic law to claim the legal high ground or assert Chinese interests. It can be used to thwart an opponent's operational freedom and shape the operational space. It is also used to build international support and manage possible political repercussions of China's military

Three Warfares provides a useful schema for unpacking Beijing's approach [...] the constant discussion of China's [...] capabilities by its adversaries, which invariably surrounds any agreements, serves as psychological warfare by reinforcing perceptions of China's strength, without the need for sabre-rattling or messaging directly from Beijing that might conflict with rhetoric of a peaceful rise.

— Matt Sawers, AIIA

Anne-Marie Brady, a politics professor at the University of Canterbury, in her book Making the Foreign Serve China, has described the tactics used including,

...appointing foreigners with access to political power to high profile roles in Chinese companies or Chinese-funded entities in the host country. [...] Co-opting foreign academics, entrepreneurs, and politicians to promote China's perspective in the media and academia. Build up positive relations with susceptible individuals via shows of generous political hospitality in China.

=== Distraction ===
Three warfares has been labelled a tool for distraction by Western analysts, with the aim of distracting from the "much larger organizational and operational infrastructure that exists under the CCP".

== Examples ==
China's deployment of the "three warfares" strategy has been recognized by several strategists, including Professor Kerry Gershaneck of MCU, Seth G. Jones of CSIS, Associate Professor Michael Clarke of ANU and the former CIA analyst Peter Mattis. The French Ministry of Defence considers the strategy to be the core of China's political warfare. The strategy has been seen as part of Beijing's ability to link all elements of national power for strategic ends. It may include the building of military bases in contested areas, done, not for kinetic purposes, but for psychological effect.

=== Australia and New Zealand ===
According to Sascha Dov Bachmann, Professor in Law at the University of Canberra, China has, since 2000, employed influence operations that have eroded the sovereignty of both Australia and New Zealand. It aims to undermine the integrity of the organic political processes in both countries to manufacture a friendly political environment for Beijing through the use of influence and disinformation campaigns. According to Anne-Marie Brady, the Chinese Communist Party works with the Chinese diaspora as part of a united front strategy to advance Chinese political and economic interests in New Zealand, with goals including cultivating local political leaders in the country.

=== Canada ===
In Canada, the Chinese government has conducted espionage, compromised politicians and government officials, interfered in elections, and controlled individuals and companies with ties to the government or the Chinese Communist Party (CCP). In 2025, a parliamentary inquiry concluded that China was "the most active perpetrator of state-based foreign interference targeting Canada's democratic institutions."

=== COVID-19 pandemic ===
During the COVID-19 pandemic, China used a vast disinformation campaign to claim that COVID-19 originated outside of China. It used proxy accounts, bots and even Chinese government officials and diplomats to disseminate false stories on social media. For example, Chinese state-run media falsely claimed that COVID-19 had originated in South Korea and Italy. A Chinese diplomat Zhao Lijian shared a theory that a US Army service member had brought the virus to China. The German Interior Ministry also revealed that Chinese diplomats had urged Germany to report favorably on China's COVID-19 response efforts. China has also influenced the World Health Organization to shape and steer its messaging in favour of China. Tedros Adhanom Ghebreyesus, the WHO Director General, consistently praised China's "effective" response but never criticized China for suppressing whistleblowers and ignoring the WHO's recommendations on how to stop the spread of COVID-19.

=== Czech Republic ===
According to the Czech Republic's counter-intelligence agency Security Information Service (BIS) 2014 report, "China's administration and its intelligence services have put an emphasis on gaining influence over Czech political and state structures and on gathering political intelligence, with active participation by select Czech elites, including politicians and state officials."

=== India ===
According to Abhijit Singh, a research fellow at MP-IDSA, a news item dated 29 January 2013 and carried by China's state-owned Xinhua News Agency on the self-immolations by Tibetans, is an example of media warfare. The news story was related to trying to find a judicial "Indian connection" to the immolations; however, the court overseeing the case did not give a verdict.

The Times of India reported that during the 2017 Doklam standoff, China used the three warfares against India. Media warfare was waged with the aim of stopping India from proceeding with its action in Bhutan and belittling Bhutan's claims. China's media and multiple ministries made statements at numerous public forums with the same goal. Psychological warfare included calling India's foreign minister a liar and asserting that China would change its stance regarding the Indian state of Sikkim, and in turn "free" Sikkim from Indian control. Legal warfare included Chinese statements saying that Bhutan had accepted Chinese claims on Doklam and that the 1890 convention is to be followed while ignoring the 1914 convention.

=== Japan ===
The 2025–2026 China–Japan diplomatic crisis has been cited as an example of a pretext for China's deployment of the three warfares against Japan.

=== South China Sea ===
Since 2013, China has reclaimed land and fortified a number of islands in the South China Sea. The reclamation projects and deployment of military assets in the islands show China's efforts to "undermine the psychological ability of the other claimants (Vietnam, the Philippines, Brunei, and Malaysia) to oppose its own". It has also deployed maritime militia in the region to create confusion among the navies of these nations. It has followed an aggressive messaging initiative using diplomatic pressure, news media and other media "to promote narratives reinforcing the historicity of its claim and warning others to refrain from antagonism". China has also consistently attempted to push narratives that show itself as the upholder of international law in the South China Sea region as well as its own interpretations of international law to oppose the other nations' positions and to delegitimize the arbitration process.

=== Taiwan ===
The PLA's Unit 61716, also known as Base 311, in Fuzhou was founded in 2005 to conduct three warfares operations against Taiwan. China has used three warfares against Taiwan through the efforts of the PLA's former General Political Department's Base 311 which oversaw at least six regiments. In peacetime, Base 311's employment includes a commercial front, the China Huayi Broadcasting Corporation. China's push for other countries to recognize its efforts, whether peaceful or not, for Chinese unification has been described as part of the three warfares doctrine.

=== United States ===
In April 2014, The Pentagon released a report it which it claimed the PLA was using its three warfares strategy and warned of China's use of coercive economic inducements and other non-traditional methods to weaken the resolve of the US and its regional partners to defend the islands and oceans of the South and East China seas. In 2016, the Journal of Strategic Security reported that China uses the three warfares strategy to influence the international community, and the United States in particular, to forestall the development and implementation of any counter strategy to its cyber-espionage campaign, which has resulted in losses of $338 billion to the United States. In 2020, Chinese lawyers sued the United States for covering up COVID-19, an example of three warfares being conducted as if it were a military operation.

=== Xinjiang ===
The three-warfares doctrine has been seen to have been used in Xinjiang, even though it is an internal province of China. The use of three warfares and the concept of "social management" is a means of preserving its hold on power. China implemented a Social Credit System through which it collects and analyzes metadata to shape and "score" the economic and social behavior of citizens. This scoring system allows for "predictive policing", enabling the state to make predictive assessments of perceived threats to its authority.

== Countermeasures ==
A strategy to combat three warfares, as suggested by Abhijit Singh, could focus on "creating awareness" about three warfares: establishing SOPs for "impact mitigation", staying "flexible" in response, and "pre-empting attacks". Countermeasures suggested have included documenting, exposing, publicizing and amplifying Chinese operations and activities using three warfares techniques.

== Commentary ==
Dean Cheng of The Heritage Foundation's Asian Study Center, an American think tank, warns that the phrase is a misnomer, that many do not take political warfare (media, psychological or law warfare) as real "warfare". He says that for the Chinese, "political warfare [...] is a strategic option that is underway all the time".

== See also ==
- Chinese information operations and information warfare
- Public opinion struggle
- Transnational lawfare by China
