= Ryan Hass =

American foreign policy analyst and diplomat

- Other name: 何瑞恩
- Education: University of Washington (BA); Paul H. Nitze School of Advanced International Studies
- Occupations: Policy analyst, former U.S. diplomat and security official
- Employer: Brookings Institution
- Organization(s): The Scowcroft Group, National Committee on U.S.-China Relations
- Board member of: The Asia Foundation
- Spouse: Meredith Sumpter
- Children: 4 (Helen, Reed, Byron, and Henry)

Ryan Hass is an American foreign policy analyst currently serving as director of the Brookings Institution's John L. Thornton China Center and the Chen-Fu and Cecilia Yen Koo Chair in Taiwan Studies.

He is also a trustee of The Asia Foundation, a nonresident affiliated fellow at Yale Law School's Paul Tsai China Center, a senior advisor at The Scowcroft Group and the McLarty Associates, and a term member of the Council on Foreign Relations.

Hass' research focuses on U.S. policy toward East Asia, in particular U.S.-China relations, U.S.-Taiwan relations, the Korean Peninsula, regional security, and maritime issues.

== Education ==
Hass holds a BA (2001) from the University of Washington and attended Johns Hopkins School of Advanced International Studies for graduate studies between 2001 and 2002 before joining the U.S. Department of State.

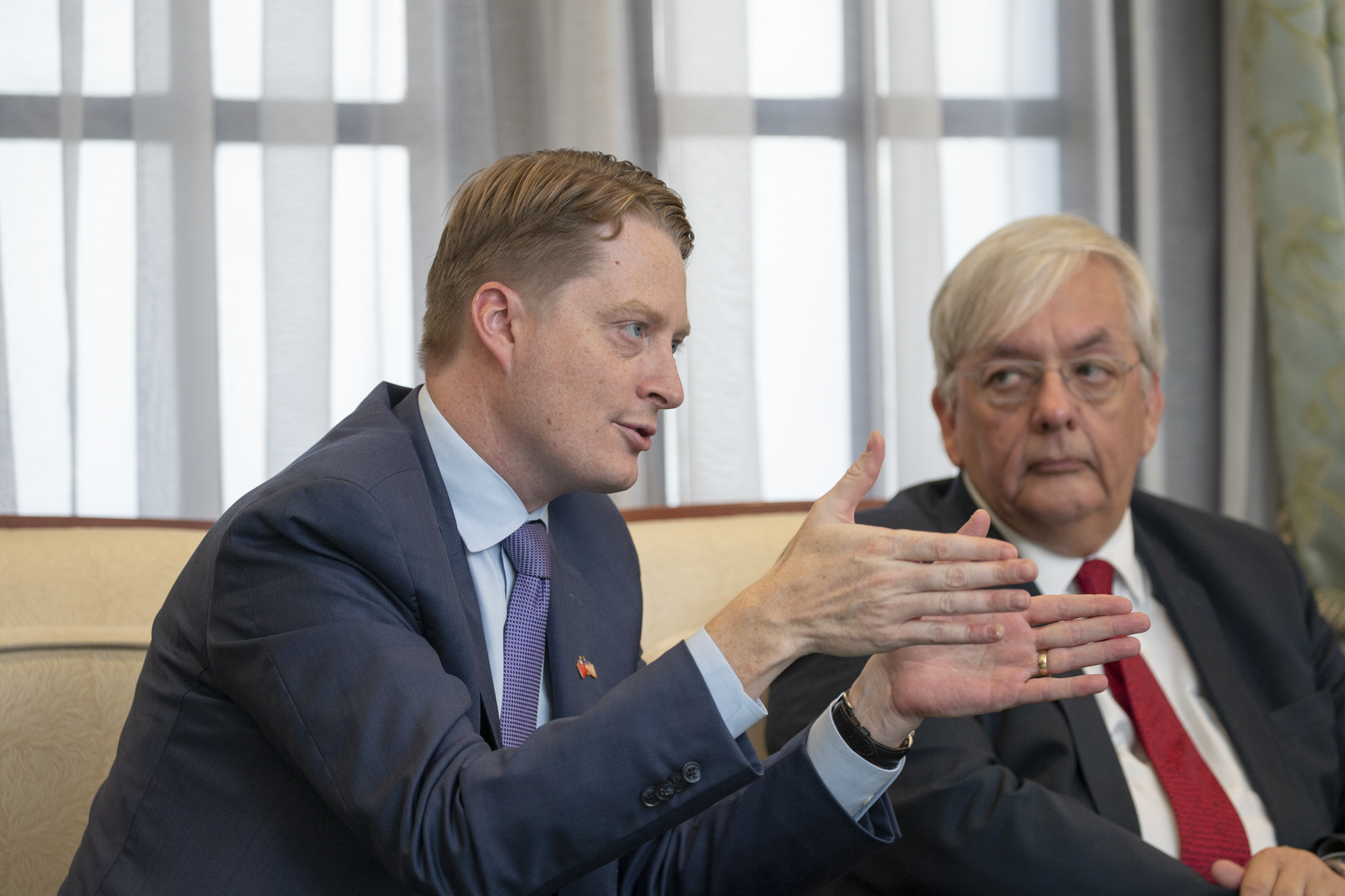
Ryan Hass in Taiwan as part of the National Committee on American Foreign Policy delegation's visit.

== Career ==
Hass joined the U.S. Foreign Service in 2003 as a consular officer in the US Embassy in Seoul and subsequently served in a variety of positions, including Political-Military Officer in the Office of Taiwan Coordination (2005–2007) and political officer in US Embassy, Beijing (2009–2012).

Between 2013 and 2017, Hass served as Director for China, Taiwan, and Mongolian Affairs at the White House National Security Council in the Obama administration.

Hass was appointed director of Brookings' John L. Thornton China Center in July 2023.

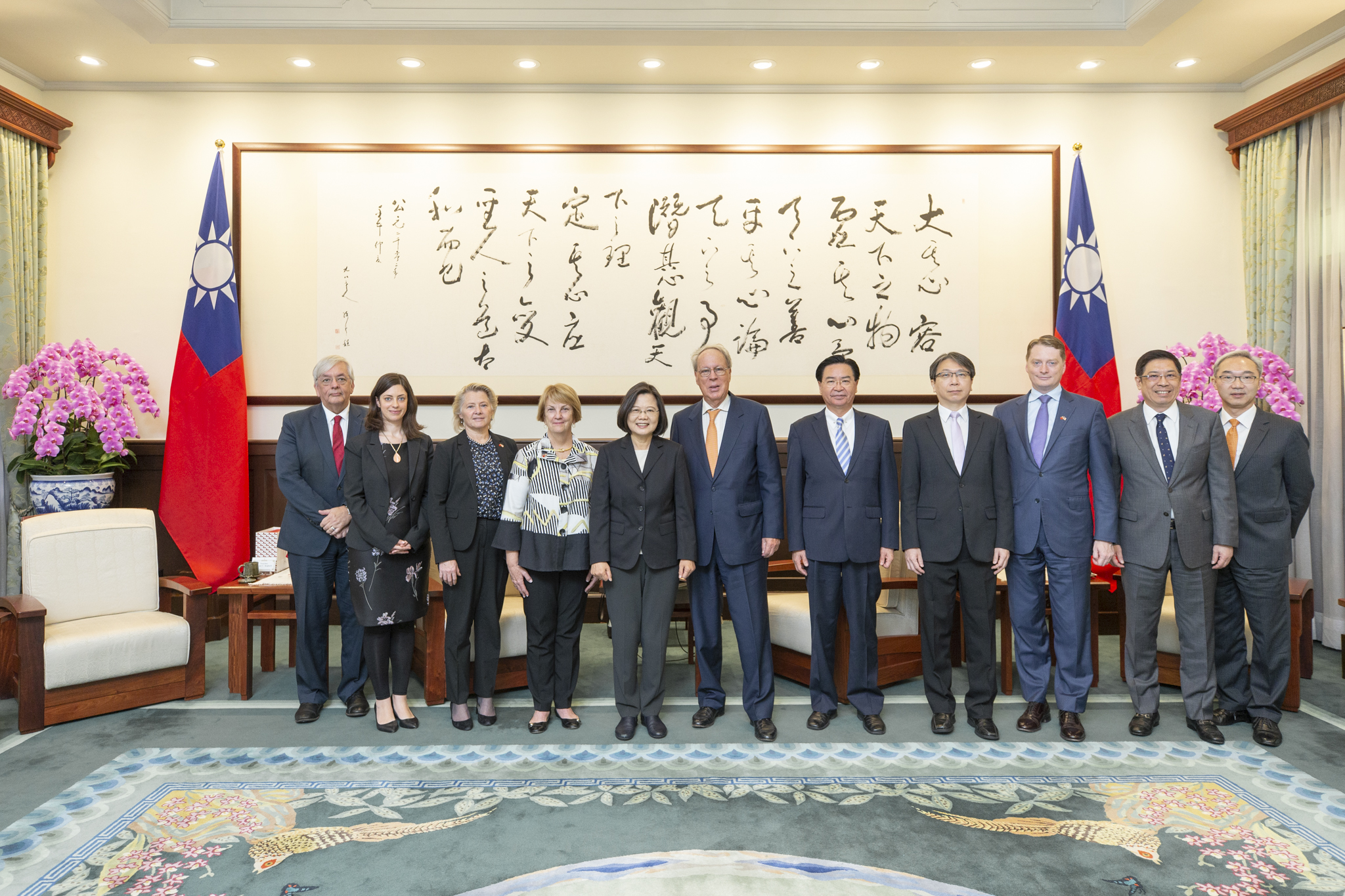
Hass met with Taiwan President Tsai Ing-wen as part of the National Committee on American Foreign Policy delegation.

== Publications ==
=== Books ===
- US-Taiwan Relations, Brookings Institution Press, April 15, 2023 (co-authored with Bonnie S. Glaser and Richard C. Bush)
- Stronger: Adapting America's China Strategy in an Age of Competitive Interdependence (Yale University Press, 2021)

=== Reports ===
- Building International Support for Taiwan, CSIS, February 13, 2024 (co-authored with Jude Blanchette and Lily McElwee)

=== Articles ===
- Questioning the presumption of a US “consensus” on China policy, Brookings Institution, July 15, 2024 (co-authored with Ali Wine)
- Avoiding War in the South China Sea, Foreign Affairs, July 9, 2024
- How will Biden and Trump tackle trade with China? Brookings Institution, April 4, 2024
- Ryan Hass on Taiwan: Is there bipartisan consensus in the United States? Taipei Times, March 18, 2024
- A roadmap for a US-China AI dialogue, Brookings Institution, January 10, 2024 (co-authored with Graham Webster)
- Ryan Hass On Taiwan: An American perspective on Taiwan's election, Taipei Times, January 4, 2024
- Kissinger Was Bold on China, in On Kissinger's Legacy, Brookings Institution, December 8, 2023 (co-authored with Adrien Chorn, Natalie Sambani, Marvin Kalb, Cheng Li, Kenneth G. Lieberthal, Michael E. O'Hanlon, Bruce Riddle, Nathan Sachs)
- The Right Way to Deter China From Attacking Taiwan, Foreign Affairs, November 8, 2023 (co-authored with Jude Blanchette)
- What America Wants From China, Foreign Affairs, October 24, 2023
- America, China, and the Virtue of Low Expectations, Foreign Affairs, Jun 28, 2023
- The Taiwan Long Game, Foreign Affairs, December 20, 2022 (co-authored with Jude Blanchette)
- The Upside of Pelosi's Unwise Taiwan Visit, Foreign Affairs, August 16, 2022
- China Is Not Ten Feet Tall, Foreign Affairs, March 3, 2021
- Don't squeeze Taiwan, Brookings Institution, February 7, 2018 (co-authored with Evan S. Medeiros)
