= Richard C. Bush =

American political scientist

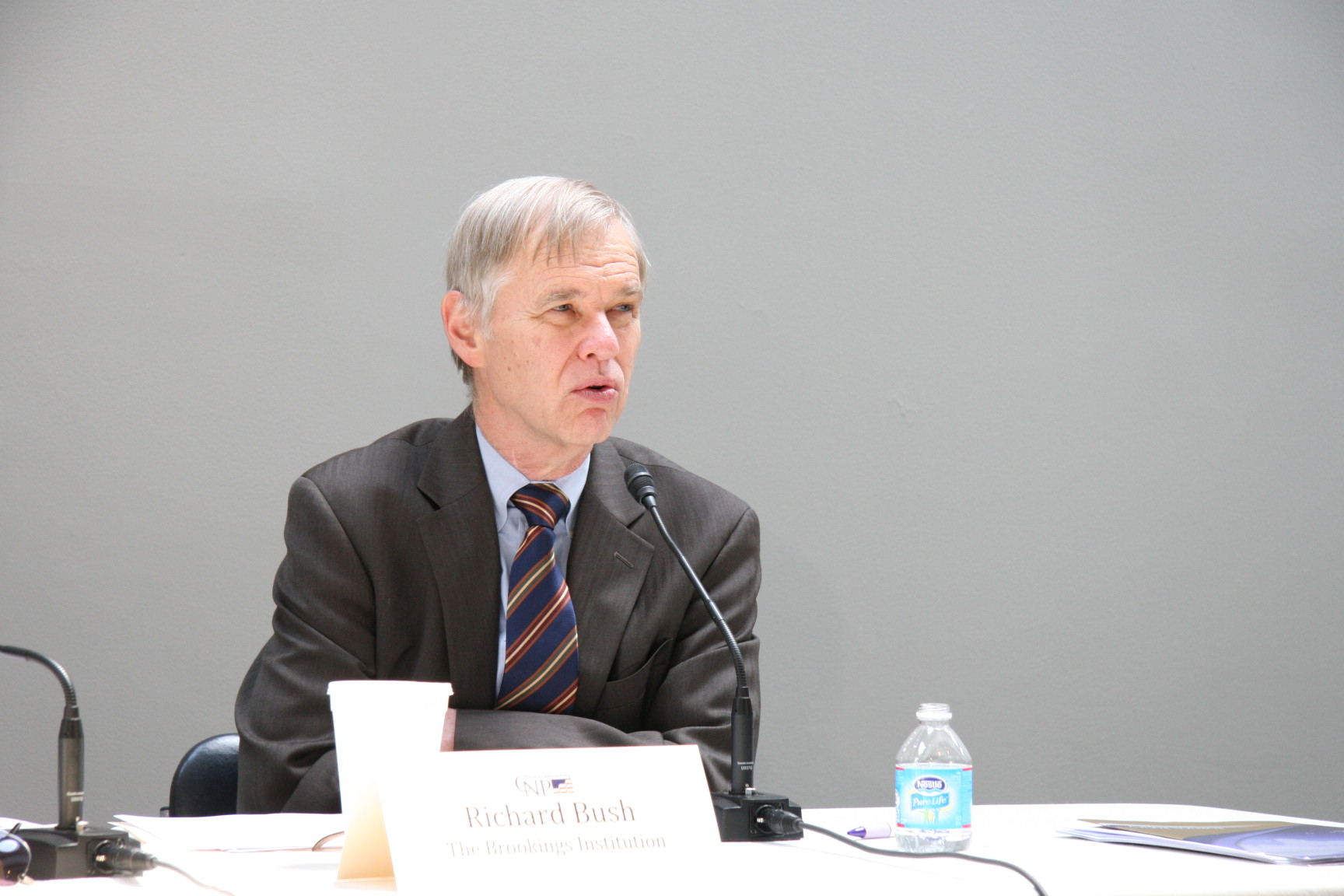
- Other name: 卜睿哲
- Education: Lawrence University (BA); Columbia University (MA, PhD)
- Occupations: Political scientist, policy analyst
- Employer: Brookings Institution

Richard C. Bush III is an American political scientist, foreign policy analyst, and a specialist in China affairs. Since 2002, he has served as the director of Center for Northeast Asian Policy Studies (CNAPS) of the Brookings Institution, and concurrently as the inaugural Michael H. Armacost Chair in Foreign Policy Studies.

== Education ==
Bush holds a B.A. (1969) from Lawrence University and an M.A. (1973) and Ph.D. (1978) in political science from Columbia University. His dissertation focused on studies about China-Taiwan relations, U.S.-China relations, the Korean Peninsula, and Japan's security.

== Career ==
Bush began his career in 1977 with the China Council of the Asia Society.

In 1983 he became a staff consultant on the House Foreign Affairs Committee's Subcommittee on Asian and Pacific Affairs. In 1993 he moved up to the full committee, where he worked on Asia issues and served as liaison with Democratic members.

In 1995, he became national intelligence officer for East Asia and a member of the National Intelligence Council (NIC). He left the NIC in 1997 to become head of the American Institute in Taiwan (AIT).

He has served in the executive and legislative branches of U. S. government for 19 years, including those of National Intelligence Officer for East Asia and AIT's chairman of the board (1997-2002).

== Publications ==
=== Books ===
- At Cross Purposes: U.S.-Taiwan Relations since 1942, Routledge, February 28, 2004
- Untying the Knot: Making Peace in the Taiwan Strait, Brookings Institution, 2006
- A War Like No Other: The Truth About China's Challenge to America, John Wiley & Sons, March 1, 2007 (co-authored with Michael E. O'Hanlon)
- The Perils of Proximity: China-Japan Security Relations, Brookings Institution Press, July 15, 2013
- Hong Kong in the Shadow of China: Living With the Leviathan, Brookings Institution Press, October 11, 2016
- Difficult Choices: Taiwan's Quest for Security and the Good Life, Brookings Institution Press, April 13, 2021
- US-Taiwan Relations, Brookings Institution Press, April 15, 2023 (co-authored with Ryan Hass and Bonnie S. Glaser)

== Bibliography ==
- Bush, Richard C. (2013). Uncharted Strait: The Future of China-Taiwan Relations. Washington, D.C.: The Brookings Institution. ISBN 978-0-8157-2384-4.
- Bush, Richard C. (2017). One China Policy Primer. Washington, D.C.: The Brookings Institution.
