= Political warfare =

Use of political means to compel an opponent with hostile intent

Political warfare is the intentional use of non-combat methods, such as diplomacy, misinformation, and economics, to affect the decision making of governments. Other tactics to influence policy making include cyber attacks, and propaganda campaigns. Psychological operations are for strategic and tactical military objectives and may be intended for military and civilian populations.

Political warfare also involves "the art of heartening friends and disheartening enemies, of gaining help for one's cause and causing the abandonment of the enemies'".

== Concept ==
Political warfare utilizes all instruments short of war available to a nation to achieve its national objectives. A commonly used method of political warfare is "effective policy forcefully explained", or more directly, "overt policy forcefully backed".

Thomas Rid stated that modern disinformation emerged in the early 1920s and developed through several major stages, with each generation refining its methods and terminology. The first phase took shape between the World Wars and during the Great Depression, when the rise of radio transformed journalism into a faster, more competitive industry. The early influence campaigns were secretive and often relied on forged information, sometimes targeting both the Soviet Union and the United States. After World War II, the second phase saw disinformation become more organized and systematic. U.S. intelligence agencies, especially the CIA, expanded covert influence efforts under the label "political warfare," combining truthful leaks, fabricated material, and other tactics to weaken opponents. Meanwhile, Eastern Bloc countries more openly referred to these activities as "disinformation," though both sides shared the objective of undermining their adversaries.

== In history ==
In ancient Greece, a famous example is that of the Trojan Horse, which used deception for tactical military objectives. Propaganda was commonly utilized, including Greek rhetoric and theatre which used words and images to influence populations throughout the Hellenic world. This practice has left a lasting legacy of speech as a mechanism of political power, greater than force in solving disputes and inducing submission. During this same period, Alexander the Great used coinage imprinted with his own image, indirectly forcing conquered nations to accept his legitimacy as national ruler and to unite disparate nations together under his dominion. Sun Tzu placed emphasis on deceiving the enemy army to gain an advantage in battle.

Ancient Rome utilized similar political warfare as the Greeks including rhetoric, as displayed by Cicero; and art, as seen in coinage, statues, architecture, engineering, and mosaics. All of these elements were intended to portray Rome's imperial dominance over its subject nations and the superior nature of Roman society. Following a religious vision, the emperor Constantine I in 330 CE bound the Roman state to the universal Christian Church. In doing so, he linked "religious commitment with imperial ambition" that proved to be quite successful and powerful. One long-lasting symbol of this is the Chi Rho, which forms the first two letters of the Greeks' name for Christ. This symbol was used for over one thousand years by Constantine's successors as a symbol of "imperial majesty and divine authority" and still is a powerful symbol within Christianity.

Carl von Clausewitz would state that war is an expression of politics "by another means".

== By country ==
=== China ===
Since the founding of the People's Republic of China (PRC) in 1949, the Chinese Communist Party (CCP) have centered much of their political warfare efforts within the United Front Work Department. The CCP conception of political warfare includes the "three warfares" of public opinion warfare, psychological warfare, and legal warfare, among others. Political warfare encompasses influence operations such as the doctrine of China's peaceful rise and social media campaigns to reshape public opinion in other countries about China.

Taiwan remains a major target of PRC political warfare efforts. The PRC's political warfare campaign aims to isolate Taiwan from the international community and interfere in Taiwan's democratic system and institutions. India has also become a target of increasing importance for PRC influence operations.

=== Soviet Union and Russia ===
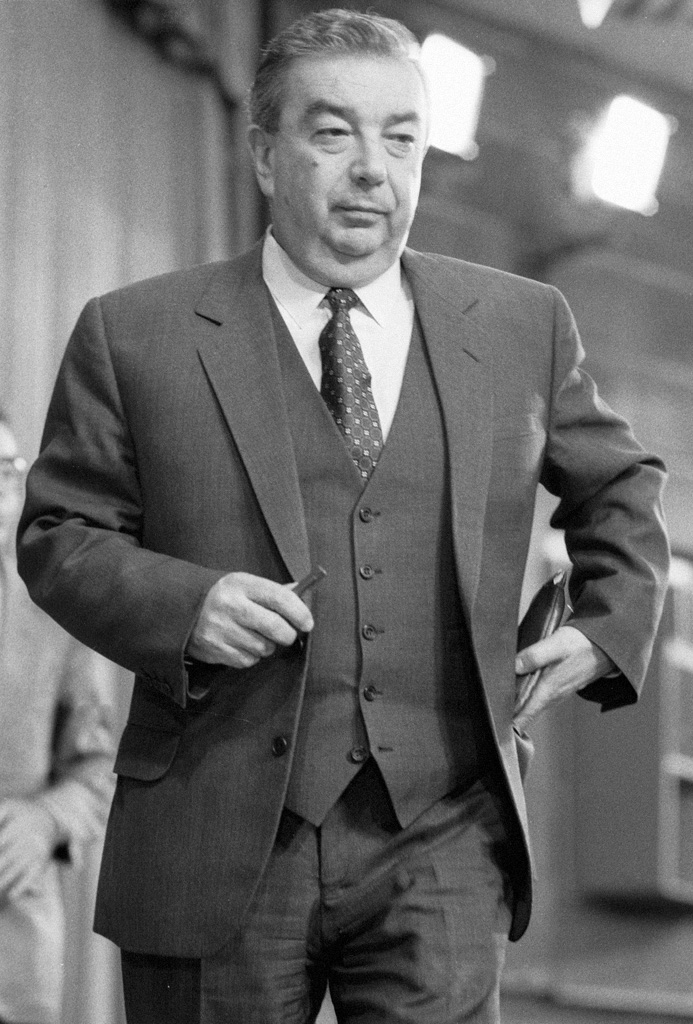
In 1992, Director of Russia's Foreign Intelligence Service (SVR) Yevgeny Primakov admitted that the KGB was behind the Soviet newspaper articles claiming that AIDS was created by the U.S. government.

Operation Denver (sometimes referred to as "Operation INFEKTION" from German: INFEKTION) was an active measure disinformation campaign run by the KGB in the 1980s to plant the idea that the United States had invented HIV/AIDS as part of a biological weapons research project at Fort Detrick, Maryland. Historian Thomas Boghardt popularized the codename "INFEKTION" based on the claims of former East German Ministry for State Security (Stasi) officer Günter Bohnsack, who claimed that the Stasi codename for the campaign was either "INFEKTION" or perhaps also "VORWÄRTS II" ("FORWARD II"). However, historians Christopher Nehring and Douglas Selvage found in the former Stasi and Bulgarian State Security archives materials that prove the actual Stasi codename for the AIDS disinformation campaign was Operation Denver. The operation involved "an extraordinary amount of effort – funding radio programs, courting journalists, distributing would-be scientific studies", and even became the subject of a report by Dan Rather on the CBS Evening News.

The Soviet Union used the campaign to undermine the United States' credibility, foster anti-Americanism, diplomatically isolate the U.S. abroad, and create tensions between host countries and the U.S. over the presence of American military bases, which were often portrayed as the cause of AIDS outbreaks in local populations.

=== Taiwan ===
Logo of political warfare in Taiwan

The Republic of China Government in Taiwan recognized that its Communist adversary astutely employed political warfare to capitalize upon Kuomintang weaknesses over the years since Sun Yat-sen first mounted his revolution in the 1920s, and Chiang Kai-shek's regime had come to embrace a political warfare philosophy as both a defensive necessity and as the best foundation for consolidating its power in hope of their optimistic goal of "retaking the mainland". Both the Nationalist and Communist Chinese political warfare doctrines stem from the same historical antecedents at the Whampoa Military Academy in 1924 under Soviet tutelage.

The Nationalist Chinese experience with political warfare can be treated in a much more tangible way than merely tracing doctrinal development. In the Taiwan of the 1970s, the concept was virtually synonymous with the General Political Warfare Department of the Ministry of National Defense, which authored political doctrine and was the culmination of a series of organizational manifestations of its application.

In the 21st century political warfare is primarily the responsibility of the Political Warfare Bureau.

=== United States ===
==== Creation of political warfare capacity ====
American foreign policy demonstrates a tendency to move towards political warfare in times of tension and perceived threat, and toward public diplomacy in times of improved relations and peace. American use of political warfare depends on its central political vision of the world and its subsequent foreign policy objectives. After World War II, the threat of Soviet expansion brought two new aims for American political warfare:

1. To restore Western Europe through military, economic, and political support
2. To weaken the Soviet hold on Eastern Europe through propaganda

President Harry S. Truman established a government political warfare capability in the National Security Act of 1947. The act created the U.S. National Security Council, which became the infrastructure necessary to apply military power to political purposes.

==== Containment policy ====
The Truman Doctrine was the post-WWII basis for American political warfare operations on which the United States government went further to formulate an active, defensive strategy to contain the Soviet threat.

==== Cold War era ====
RFE/RL logo

The United States used gray and black propaganda research, broadcasting, and print media operations during the Cold War to achieve its political warfare goals. These operations were conducted against Eastern European targets from Western Europe by two public-private organizations supported partly by the Central Intelligence Agency and the NSC, and partly by private corporations. These organizations were Free Europe, which was launched in 1941 and targeted Eastern Europe, and the American Committee for Liberation (AmComLib) created in 1951 to broadcast information into Soviet Russia. Both were renamed shortly thereafter and combined as Radio Free Europe/Radio Liberty (RFE/RL). Many RFE/RL recruits came either from European emigrants families who were strongly anti-Communist or from US government agencies, most notably from CIA. Officially, "the US government denied any responsibility for the radios and took care to conceal the channels of funding, personnel recruitment, and policy influence. Obviously, the major support was American, but it was plausibly not official American and it could be excluded from diplomatic intercourse and international legal complication." RFE/RL was considered to be a gray operation until its existence was publicly acknowledged by "activists" in the United States during the late 1960s. The goal of the radios was to present the truth to suppressed peoples behind the Iron Curtain "to aid in rebuilding a lively and diversified intellectual life in Europe which could ... defeat Soviet ... incursions on their freedom".

In addition, Voice of America (VOA) started broadcasting to the Soviet citizens in 1947 under the pretext of countering "more harmful instances of Soviet propaganda directed against American leaders and policies" on the part of the internal Soviet Russian-language media. The Soviet Union responded by initiating electronic jamming of VOA broadcasts on April 24, 1949.

In the fall of 1950 a group of scholars including physicists, historians and psychologists from Harvard University, the Massachusetts Institute of Technology and RAND Corporation undertook a research study of psychological warfare for the Department of State. The Project Troy Report to the Secretary of State, presented to Secretary of State on 1 February 1951, made various proposals for political warfare, including possible methods of minimizing the effects of Soviet jamming on the Voice of America broadcasts. It can be assumed that the Truman administration tried to implement plans established by the Project Troy in the project Overload and Delay. The purpose of the latter was to break the Stalinist system by increasing the number of input points in the system and by creating complex and unpredictable situations requiring action.

An overt, non-governmental form of political warfare during the Cold War emerged after President Ronald Reagan's 8 June 1982 speech to the British Parliament. In his speech, Reagan appealed for a "global crusade for democracy" and as a result, the National Endowment for Democracy (NED) was created in December 1983. The NED was a non-governmental organization (NGO) based on four fundamental foundations:

- The National Democratic Institute
- The National Republican Institute to dispense funds and training to politicians and political parties;
- The Center for International Private Enterprise to provide training, funding and networking opportunities for business associations;
- AFL–CIO to assist foreign trade unions.

The NED "funded programs in support of candidates acceptable to the US in elections in Grenada, Panama, El Salvador, and Guatemala throughout 1984 and 1985 in order to prevent communist victories, and create stable pro-US governments". It was also active in Europe, funding groups to carry promote pro-North Atlantic Treaty Organization (NATO) propaganda in Britain, as well as a "right wing French student organisation ... linked to fascist paramilitaries". Other notable efforts included anti-Sandinista propaganda and opposition efforts in Nicaragua as well as anti-Communist propaganda and opposition efforts in support of the Solidarity movement in Poland between 1984 and 1990. According to a 1991 interview in The Washington Post with one of the creators of the NED, Allen Weinstein, "a lot of what we (NED) do today was done covertly 25 years ago by the CIA".

==== 21st century ====
===== China =====
According to former U.S. officials who spoke to Reuters, the Trump administration authorized a covert influence campaign across social media in China in order to turn public opinion against the Chinese government. The operation began in 2019 and involved Central Intelligence Agency agents using bogus internet identities. They promoted negative narratives about CCP general secretary Xi Jinping's government and leaked disparaging information to international news outlets. In addition to China, the campaign also targeted countries in Southeast Asia, Africa and the South Pacific. The CIA used the same method during the Cold War when it planted daily articles against the former Soviet Union, but this risks backfiring from counter-accusations by Beijing and endangers Chinese dissidents as well as journalists, who could be falsely accused for being spies.

== See also ==
- Active measures
- Asymmetric warfare
- Information warfare
- Lawfare
- Music and political warfare
- Passive revolution
- Political Warfare Executive
- Propaganda
- Psychological warfare
- Trust Operation
- Unconventional warfare
- War of ideas
