= Bonnie S. Glaser =

American foreign policy analyst

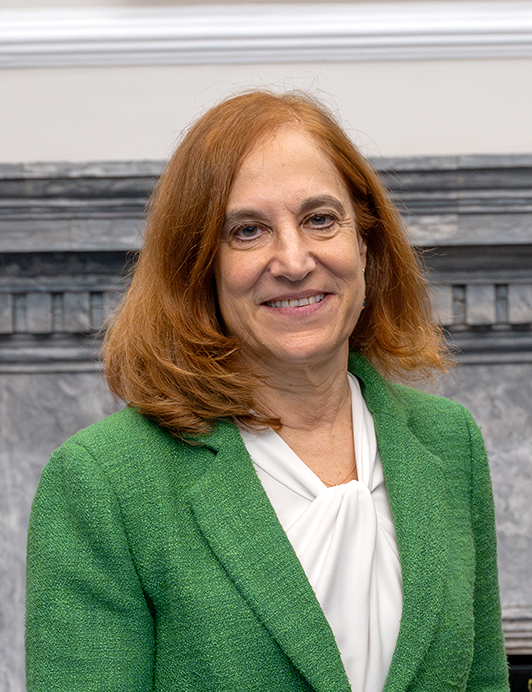
- Glaser meeting with Tsai Ing-wen on 10 March 2024 during her visit to Taiwan
- Born: Queens, New York, U.S.
- Other name: 葛來儀
- Education: Boston University (BA); SAIS, Johns Hopkins University (MA)
- Occupations: Foreign policy analyst, China specialist
- Employer: German Marshall Fund
- Board member of: National Democratic Institute
- Website: https://www.gmfus.org/profiles/bonnie-s-glaser

Bonnie S. Glaser is an American foreign policy analyst currently serving as managing director of the Indo-Pacific Program at the German Marshall Fund of the United States. She was previously a senior adviser for Asia and the founding director of the China Power Project at the Center for Strategic and International Studies. Glaser is also a non-resident fellow with the Lowy Institute, a senior associate with Pacific Forum, and a consultant for the U.S. government on East Asia. Glaser writes extensively on Chinese policy, including its foreign and military policy towards the United States., Cross-Strait relations, China's relations with Japan and Korea, Chinese perspectives on missile defense, and multilateral security in Asia.

== Education ==
Glaser received her B.A. in political science from Boston University and her M.A. with concentrations in international economics and Chinese studies from the Johns Hopkins School of Advanced International Studies.

== Career ==
Glaser began her career as a consultant for various U.S. government agencies, including the Department of Defense and Department of State. In 1997 she served as a member of the Defense Department’s Defense Policy Board China Panel.

Glaser joined CSIS in 2003 as a senior associate in the International Security Program. Since 2008 Glaser has focused on issues related to Chinese foreign and security policy at CSIS, beginning as a Senior Adviser with the Freeman Chair in China Studies.

In addition to her research, Glaser serves as a key interlocutor for experts and officials speaking at CSIS events. In 2015 Glaser shared the stage with the Chinese Ambassador to Washington, Cui Tiankai, as he delivered China's perspective following the Permanent Court of Arbitration's verdict on China's claims to the South China Sea.

=== China Power Project ===
In 2016 Glaser launched a new CSIS initiative, the China Power Project. The Glaser-directed initiative seeks to fill a void in the public's understanding of China's power and capabilities by analyzing "key developments in the country’s military, economic, technological, social and diplomatic rise" in interactive and visually friendly forms. In an interview with the Guardian where she discussed the creation of the website, Glaser said

There has been an explosion of interest in China globally, some of it because of challenges it poses and opportunities it presents. There are many misrepresentations in the public arena that are perpetuated by talking heads and even our presidential candidates. There is so much inaccurate information.

Glaser's China Power Project microsite focuses on using data and expert analysis to bring greater clarity and understanding to these questions.

Glaser left CSIS and the China Power Project in 2021. She became the director of the German Marshall Fund's Indo-Pacific Program in April 2021. Glaser is host of the China Global Podcast.

Glaser is a board member of the National Democratic Institute and is a participant of the Task Force on U.S.-China Policy convened by Asia Society's Center on US-China Relations.

== Publications ==
=== Books ===
- Hass, Ryan; Glaser, Bonnie; Bush, Richard C. (April 2023). US-Taiwan Relations. Brookings Institution Press. ISBN 978-0815739999.

=== Reports ===
- deLisle, Jacques; Glaser, Bonnie S. (April 2024). Why UN General Assembly Resolution 2758 Does Not Establish Beijing's "One China" Principle: A Legal Perspective (Report). German Marshall Fund.
- "Exposing the PRC's Distortion of UN General Assembly Resolution 2758 to Press its Claim Over Taiwan | German Marshall Fund of the United States". www.gmfus.org.
- Glaser, Bonnie S. (November 2013). Taiwan's Quest for Greater Participation in the International Community. CSIS (Report). ISBN 978-1-4422-2786-6.
- Glaser, Bonnie S.; Glosserman, Brad (September 2008). Promoting Confidence Building across the Taiwan Strait. Pacific Forum CSIS (Report). ISBN 978-0-89206-550-9.
