= Orlické Záhoří =

- Municipality
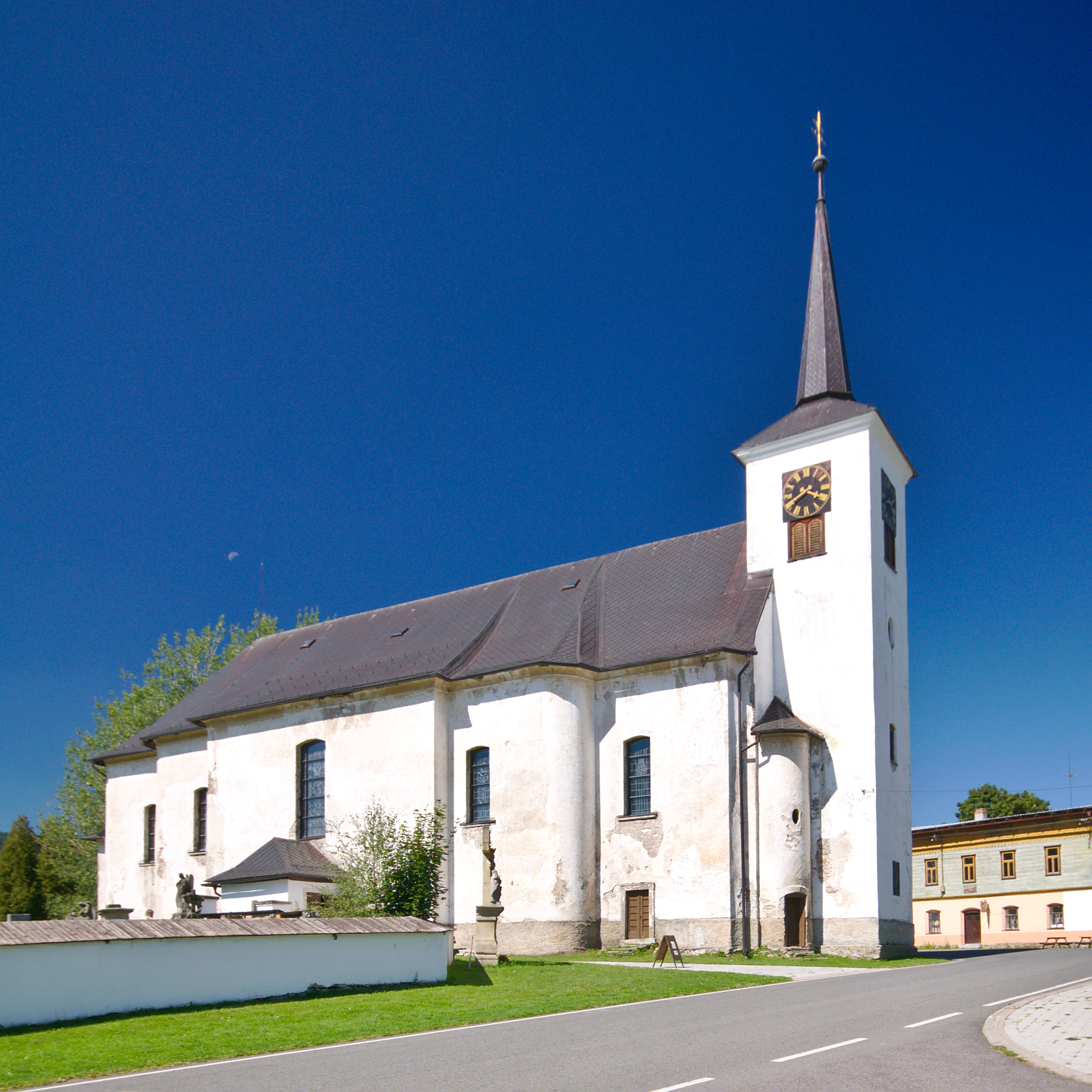
- Church of Saint John the Baptist

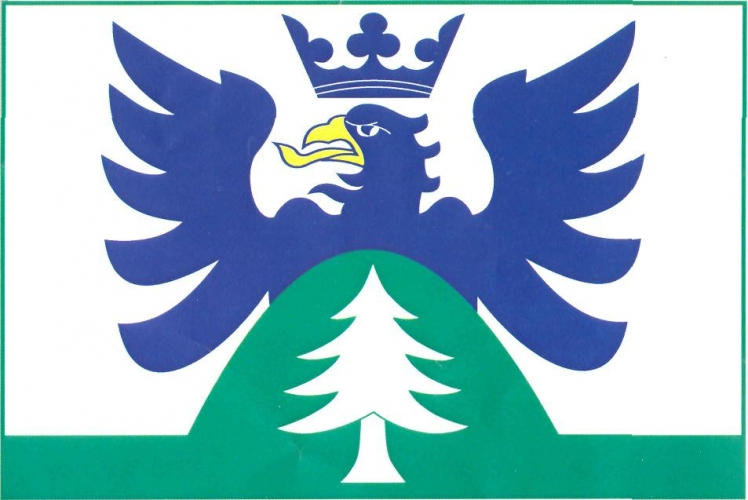
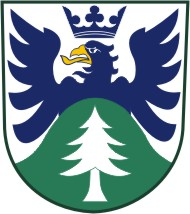
- Flag Coat of arms

- Location in the Czech Republic
- Coordinates: 50°17′4″N 16°27′8″E
- Country: Czech Republic
- Region: Hradec Králové
- District: Rychnov nad Kněžnou
- First mentioned: 1571

Area
  - Total: 29.15 km^{2} (11.25 sq mi)
- Elevation: 649 m (2,129 ft)

Population (2026-01-01)
  - Total: 213
  - Density: 7.31/km^{2} (18.9/sq mi)
- Time zone: UTC+1 (CET)
  - Summer (DST): UTC+2 (CEST)
- Postal code: 517 64
- Website: www.orlickezahori.eu

Orlické Záhoří (Czech pronunciation: [ˈorlɪtskɛː ˈzaːɦor̝iː]) is a municipality and village in the Rychnov nad Kněžnou District in the Hradec Králové Region of the Czech Republic. It has about 200 inhabitants. The municipality is located on the Divoká Orlice River in the Orlické Mountains, along the border with Poland.

== Etymology ==
The name may be translated from Czech as 'Orlické transmountain area'.

== Geography ==
Orlické Záhoří is located about 45 kilometres (28 mi) east of Hradec Králové. It lies in the Orlické Mountains. The highest point is a contour line on the slope of the mountain Jelenka at 1,064 m (3,491 ft) above sea level. The municipality consists of several settlements scattered in the valley of the Divoká Orlice River. It lies along the border with Poland, which matches the flow of the Divoká Orlice river in this area.

== History ==
The settlement of the area is connected with the work of glassmakers and lumberjacks in the Orlické Mountains in the period 1590–1600. Orlické Záhoří was established in 1951 by merger of settlements Bedřichovka, Černá Voda, Jadrná, Kunštát, Trčkov and Zelenka.

== Demographics ==
Historical population

Year	Pop.	±%
1869	2,604	—
1880	2,816	+8.1%
1890	2,938	+4.3%
1900	2,782	−5.3%
1910	2,765	−0.6%

Year	Pop.	±%
1921	2,444	−11.6%
1930	2,216	−9.3%
1950	216	−90.3%
1961	321	+48.6%
1970	306	−4.7%

Year	Pop.	±%
1980	268	−12.4%
1991	241	−10.1%
2001	211	−12.4%
2011	185	−12.3%
2021	183	−1.1%

Source: Censuses

== Transport ==
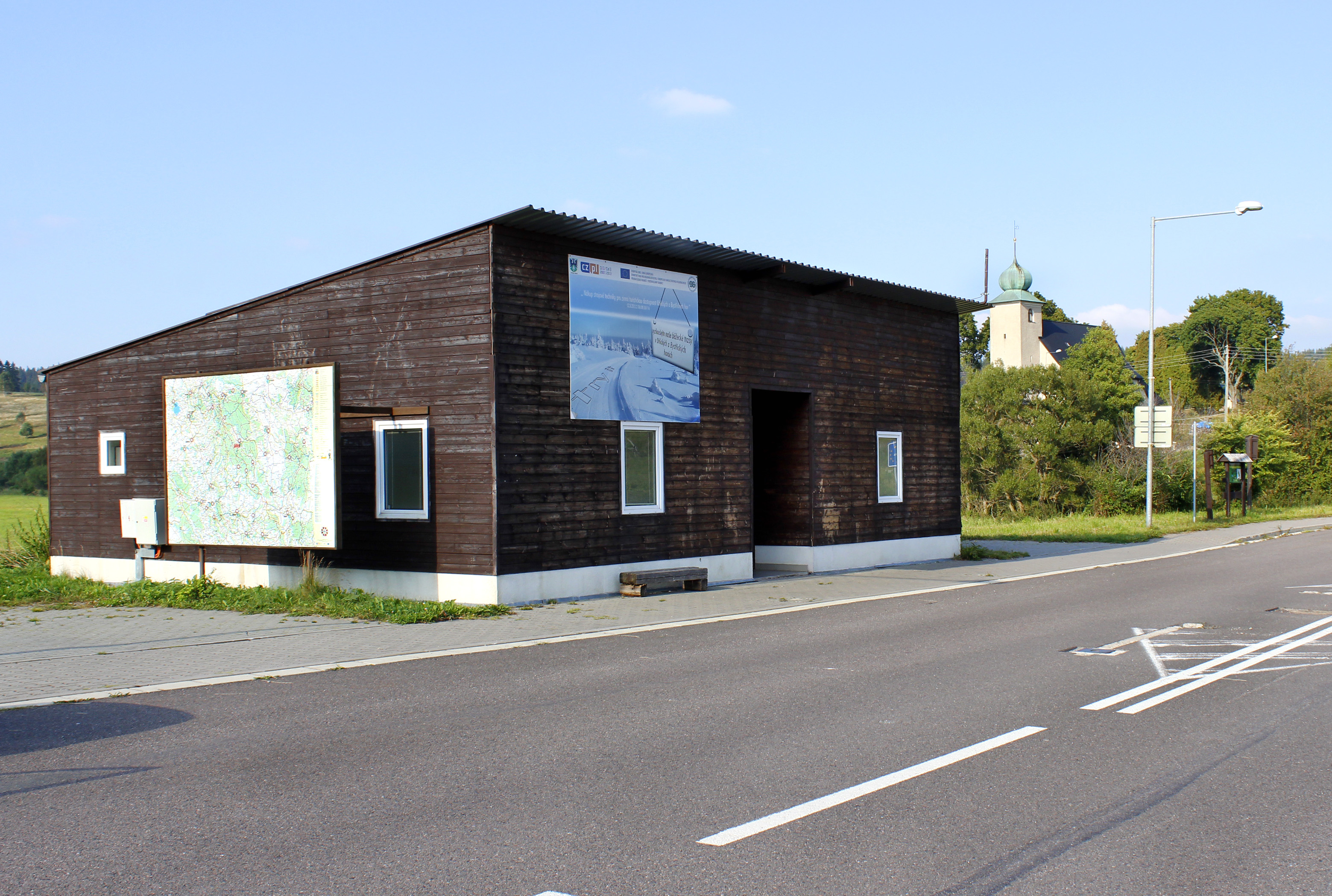
Former customs office

There are no railways or major roads passing through the municipality. The municipality has the road and pedestrian border crossing Orlické Záhoří / Mostowice and the pedestrian border crossing Bedřichovka / Lasówka to Poland.

== Sights ==
The main landmark of Orlické Záhoří is the Church of Saint John the Baptist. It was built in the late Baroque style in 1754–1763, when it replaced an old wooden church.

== Twin towns – sister cities ==
Orlické Záhoří is twinned with:

- Bystrzyca Kłodzka, Poland
