= Poniatów =

Poniatów may refer to the following places in Poland:

- Poniatów, Lower Silesian Voivodeship (south-west Poland)
- Poniatów, Piotrków County in Łódź Voivodeship (central Poland)
- Poniatów, Sieradz County in Łódź Voivodeship (central Poland)
