= Kieslingswalde =

Kieslingswalde is a placename of German origin that refers to:

- Idzików, Poland
- Sławnikowice, Lower Silesian Voivodeship, Poland
- Łopatki, Wąbrzeźno County, Poland
