= Szklarka =

Szklarka may refer to the following places in Poland:

- Szklarka, Lower Silesian Voivodeship (south-west Poland)
- Szklarka, Lubusz Voivodeship (west Poland)
