= Mielnik (disambiguation) =

Mielnik is a village and municipal seat in Podlaskie Voivodeship, north-east Poland.

Mielnik may also refer to the following places:

- Mielnik, Lower Silesian Voivodeship (south-west Poland)
- Mielnik, Subcarpathian Voivodeship (south-east Poland)
- Mielnik, West Pomeranian Voivodeship (north-west Poland)
- Gail McIntyre, Character in Coronation Street
