= Sauerbrunn =

Sauerbrunn or Sauerbrun may refer to:

== Locations ==
=== Austria ===
- Sauerbrunn Castle (das Schloss Sauerbrunn) nearby Pöls, Styria, Austria
- A mineral water from Obladis, Landeck District, Tyrol, Austria
- Bad Sauerbrunn (until 1987 simply Sauerbrunn, Bavarian: Sauabrunn, Hungarian: Savanyúkút, Croatian: Kisela voda), the name of a mineral spa and the town

=== Czech Republic ===
- Gießhübl-Sauerbrunn, German name of Kyselka, Czech Republic
- Biliner sauerbrunn, German name of Bílinská kyselka, mineral water from Bílina, Czech Republic

=== Poland ===
- German name of a district in Szczawina (German: Sauerbrunn & Neuhain), Glatzer Land, Silesia

=== Romania ===
- German name of the village Valea Borcutului, which is administered by the spa town Sângeorz-Băi in Bistrița-Năsăud County, Transylvania

== People ==
- Becky Sauerbrunn (born 1985), American soccer player
- Karl Drais (1785–1851), German inventor, also known as Charles de Sauerbrun (Sauerbronn), Baron von Drais
- Todd Sauerbrun (born 1973), American football player
