= Gmina Bystrzyca Kłodzka =

Gmina Bystrzyca Kłodzka Bystrzyca Kłodzka Commune
- Gmina
- Coat of arms
- Interactive map of Gmina Bystrzyca Kłodzka
- Coordinates (Bystrzyca Kłodzka): 50°18′N 16°39′E
- Country: Poland
- Voivodeship: Lower Silesian
- County: Kłodzko
- Seat: Bystrzyca Kłodzka

Area
  - Gmina: 337.82 km^{2} (130.43 sq mi)

Population (2019-06-30)
  - Gmina: 18,925
  - Density: 56.021/km^{2} (145.09/sq mi)
  - Urban: 10,134
  - Rural: 8,791
- Website: http://www.bystrzycaklodzka.pl/

Gmina Bystrzyca Kłodzka is an urban-rural gmina (administrative district) in Kłodzko County, Lower Silesian Voivodeship, in south-western Poland. Its seat is the town of Bystrzyca Kłodzka, which lies approximately 16 kilometres (10 mi) south of Kłodzko, and 96 kilometres (60 mi) south of the regional capital Wrocław.

The gmina covers an area of 337.82 square kilometres (130.4 sq mi), and as of 2019 its total population is 18,925.

== Neighbouring gminas ==
Gmina Bystrzyca Kłodzka is bordered by the town of Polanica-Zdrój and the gminas of Kłodzko, Lądek-Zdrój, Międzylesie, Stronie Śląskie and Szczytna. It also borders the Czech Republic.

== Villages ==
Apart from the town of Bystrzyca Kłodzka, the gmina contains the villages of Długopole Dolne, Długopole-Zdrój, Gorzanów, Huta, Idzików, Kamienna, Lasówka, Marcinków, Marianówka, Międzygórze, Mielnik, Młoty, Mostowice, Nowa Bystrzyca, Nowa Łomnica, Nowy Waliszów, Paszków, Piotrowice, Pławnica, Pokrzywno, Poniatów, Ponikwa, Poręba, Rudawa, Spalona, Stara Bystrzyca, Stara Łomnica, Starkówek, Stary Waliszów, Szczawina, Szklarka, Szklary, Topolice, Wilkanów, Wójtowice, Wyszki, Zabłocie and Zalesie.

== Twin towns – sister cities ==
Gmina Bystrzyca Kłodzka is twinned with:

- Amberg, Germany
- Kaźmierz, Poland
- Massa Martana, Italy
- Orlické Záhoří, Czech Republic
- Ústí nad Orlicí, Czech Republic
- Zdobnice, Czech Republic
