= Pokrzywno, Lower Silesian Voivodeship =

Pokrzywno
- Village
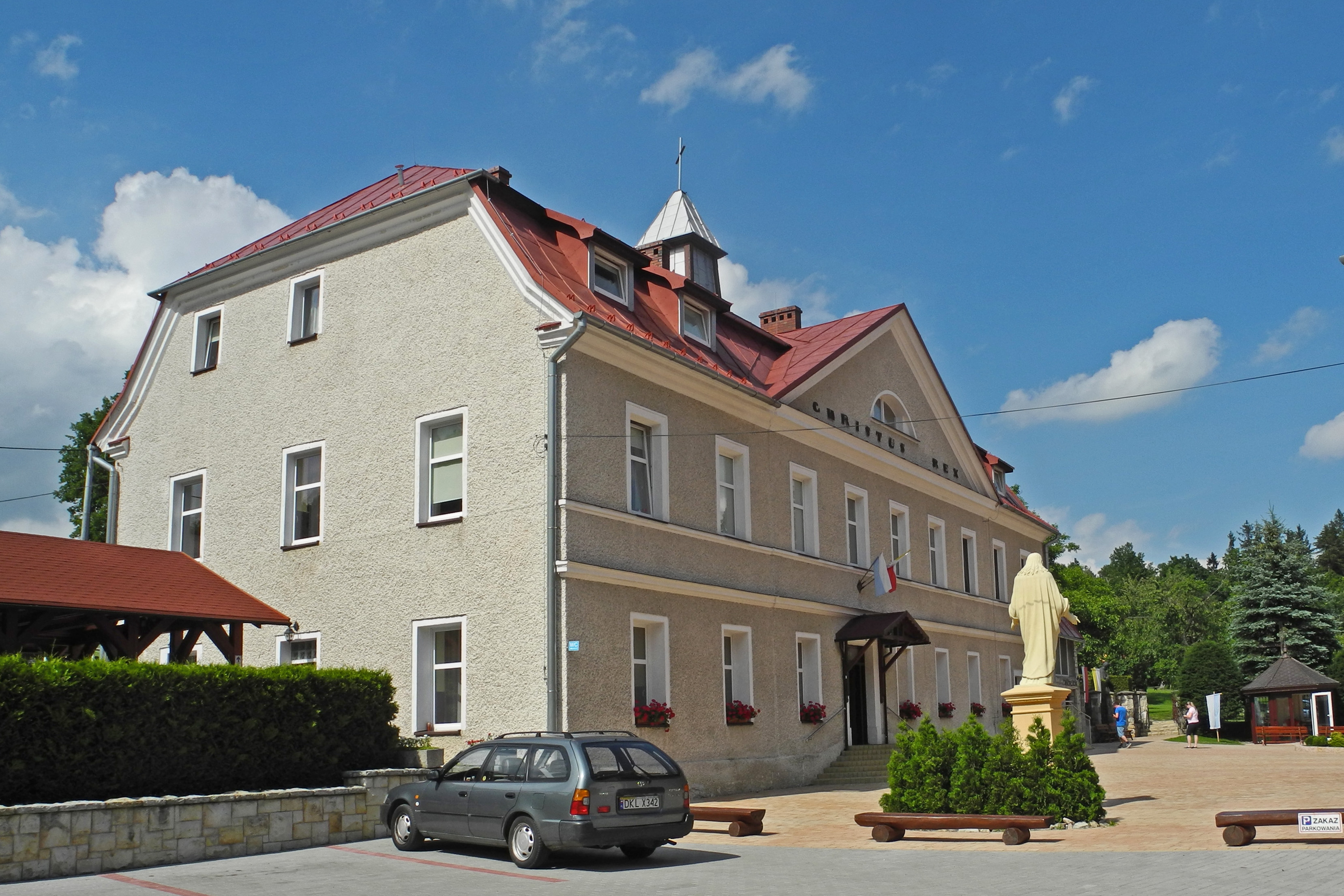

- Location within Poland
- Coordinates: 50°22′30″N 16°30′55″E
- Country: Poland
- Voivodeship: Lower Silesian
- County: Kłodzko
- Gmina: Bystrzyca Kłodzka
- Elevation (max.): 600 m (2,000 ft)

Pokrzywno [pɔˈkʂɨvnɔ] is a village in the administrative district of Gmina Bystrzyca Kłodzka, within Kłodzko County, Lower Silesian Voivodeship, in south-western Poland.
