= Nowa Bystrzyca =

- Village
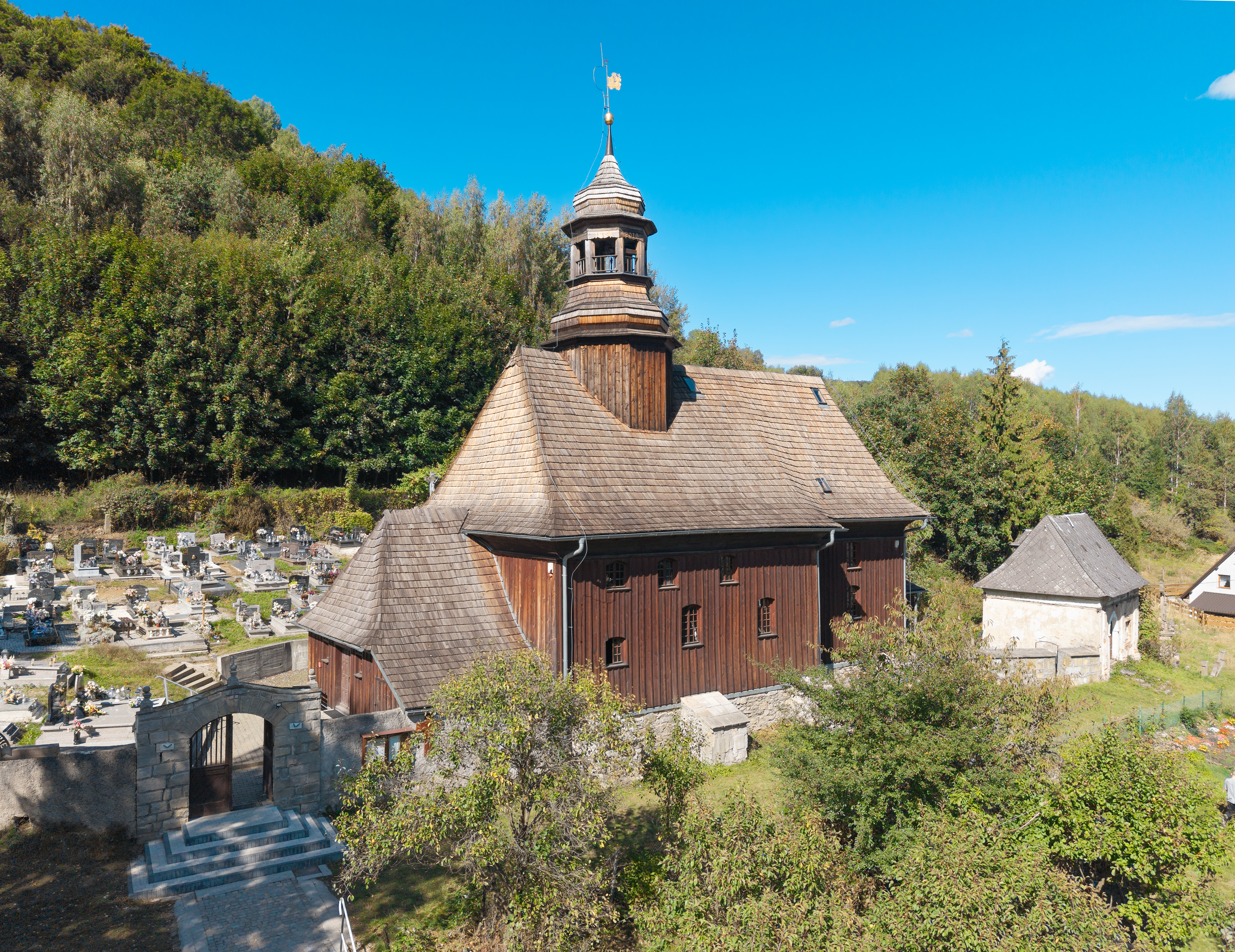
- Church of the Assumption of the Virgin Mary

- Location within Poland
- Coordinates: 50°17′39″N 16°34′32″E
- Country: Poland
- Voivodeship: Lower Silesian
- County: Kłodzko
- Gmina: Bystrzyca Kłodzka

Nowa Bystrzyca (German: Neu Weistritz) is a village in the administrative district of Gmina Bystrzyca Kłodzka, within Kłodzko County, Lower Silesian Voivodeship, in south-western Poland.
