= Pławnica =

- Village
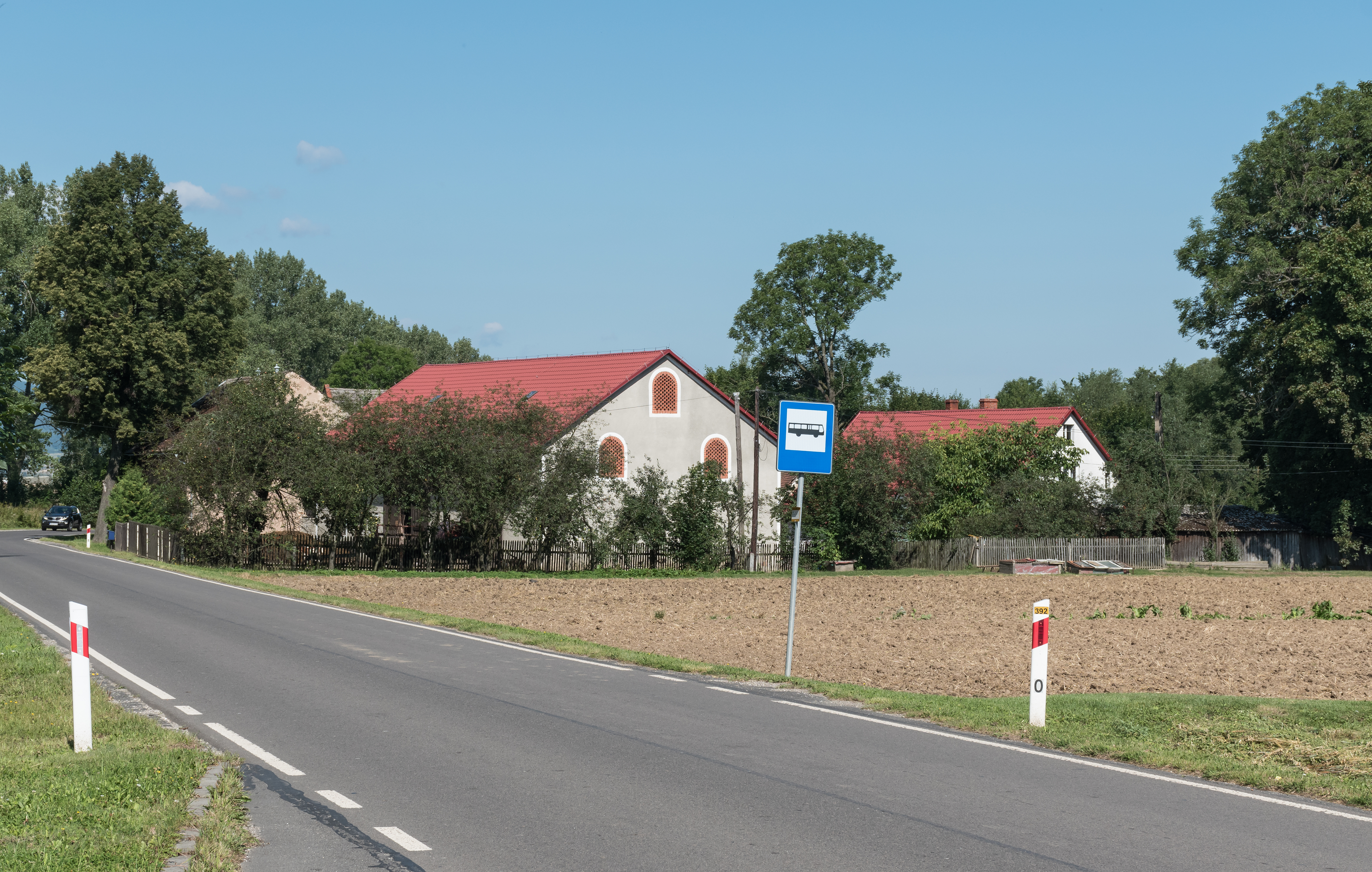

- Location within Poland
- Coordinates: 50°17′N 16°39′E
- Country: Poland
- Voivodeship: Lower Silesian
- County: Kłodzko
- Gmina: Bystrzyca Kłodzka

Pławnica [pwavˈnit͡sa] is a village in the administrative district of Gmina Bystrzyca Kłodzka, within Kłodzko County, Lower Silesian Voivodeship, in south-western Poland.
