= Ponikwa, Lower Silesian Voivodeship =

Ponikwa
- Village
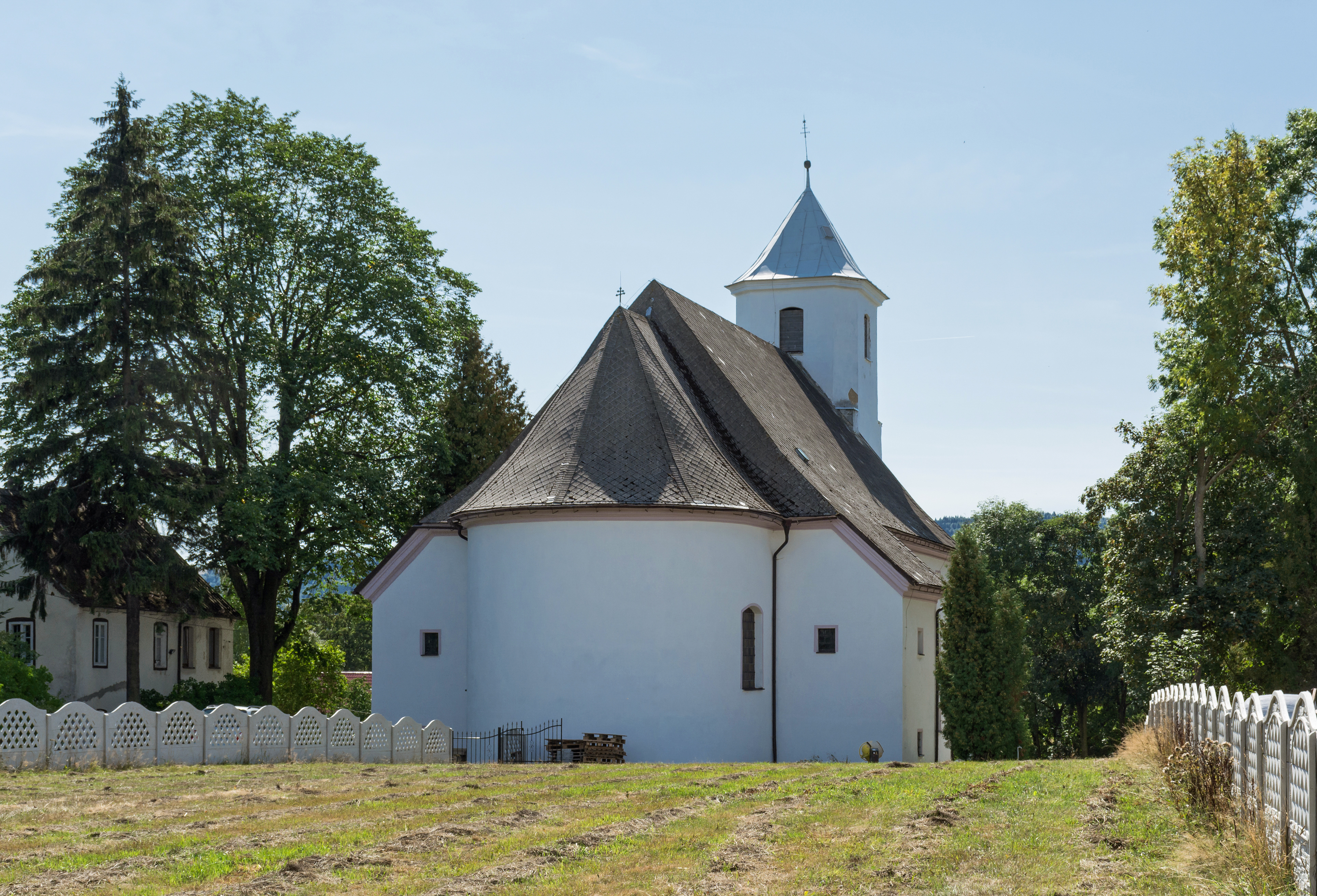

- Location within Poland
- Coordinates: 50°15′07″N 16°36′27″E
- Country: Poland
- Voivodeship: Lower Silesian
- County: Kłodzko
- Gmina: Bystrzyca Kłodzka

Ponikwa [pɔˈnikfa] (German: Verlorenwasser) is a village in the administrative district of Gmina Bystrzyca Kłodzka, within Kłodzko County, Lower Silesian Voivodeship, in south-western Poland.
