= Spalona, Kłodzko County =

Spalona
- Village
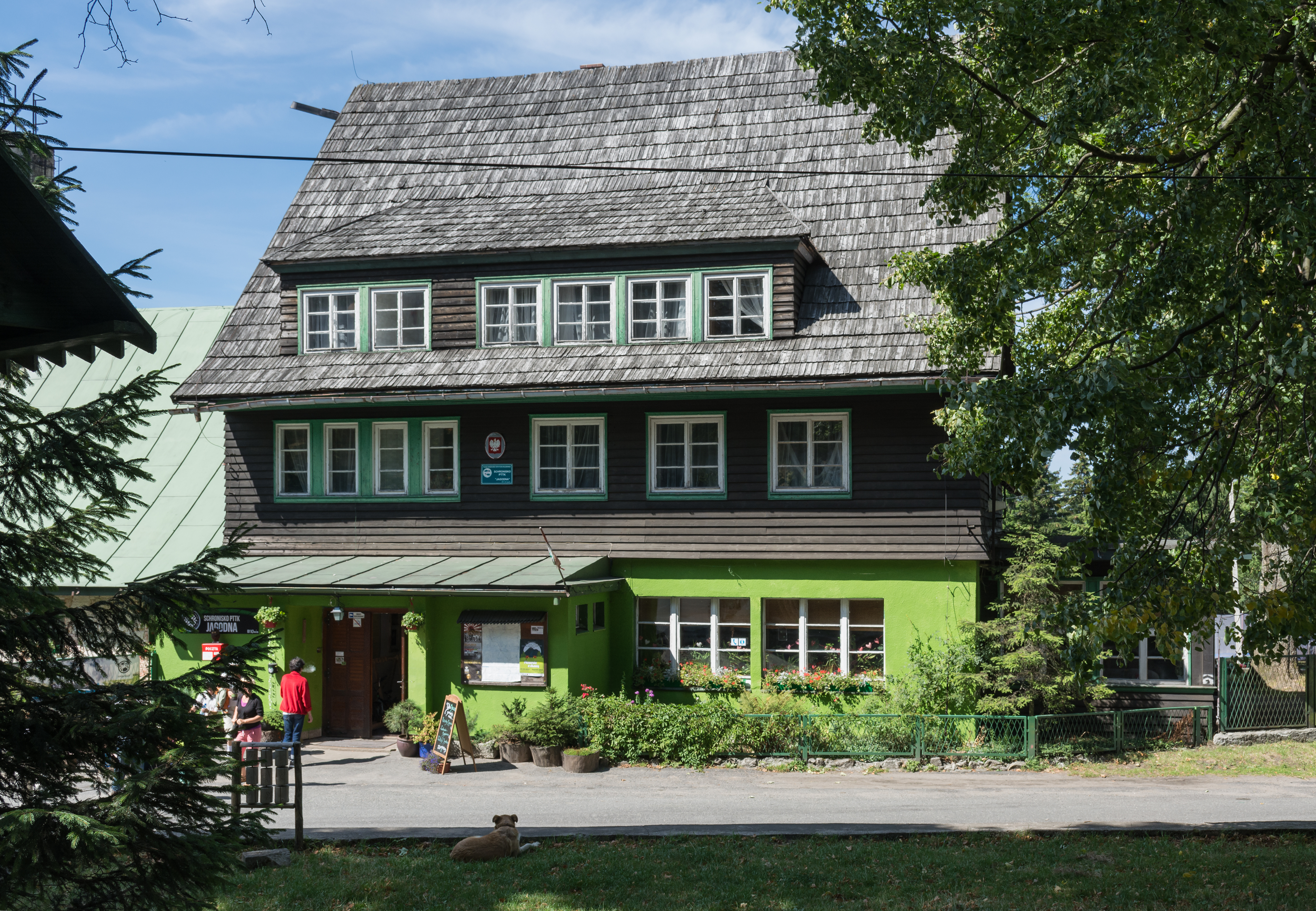

- Location within Poland
- Coordinates: 50°16′37″N 16°32′15″E
- Country: Poland
- Voivodeship: Lower Silesian
- County: Kłodzko
- Gmina: Bystrzyca Kłodzka
- Time zone: UTC+1 (CET)
  - Summer (DST): UTC+2 (CEST)
- Vehicle registration: DKL

Spalona [spaˈlɔna] is a village in the administrative district of Gmina Bystrzyca Kłodzka within Kłodzko County, Lower Silesian Voivodeship in southwestern Poland.
