= Nowa Łomnica =

- Village
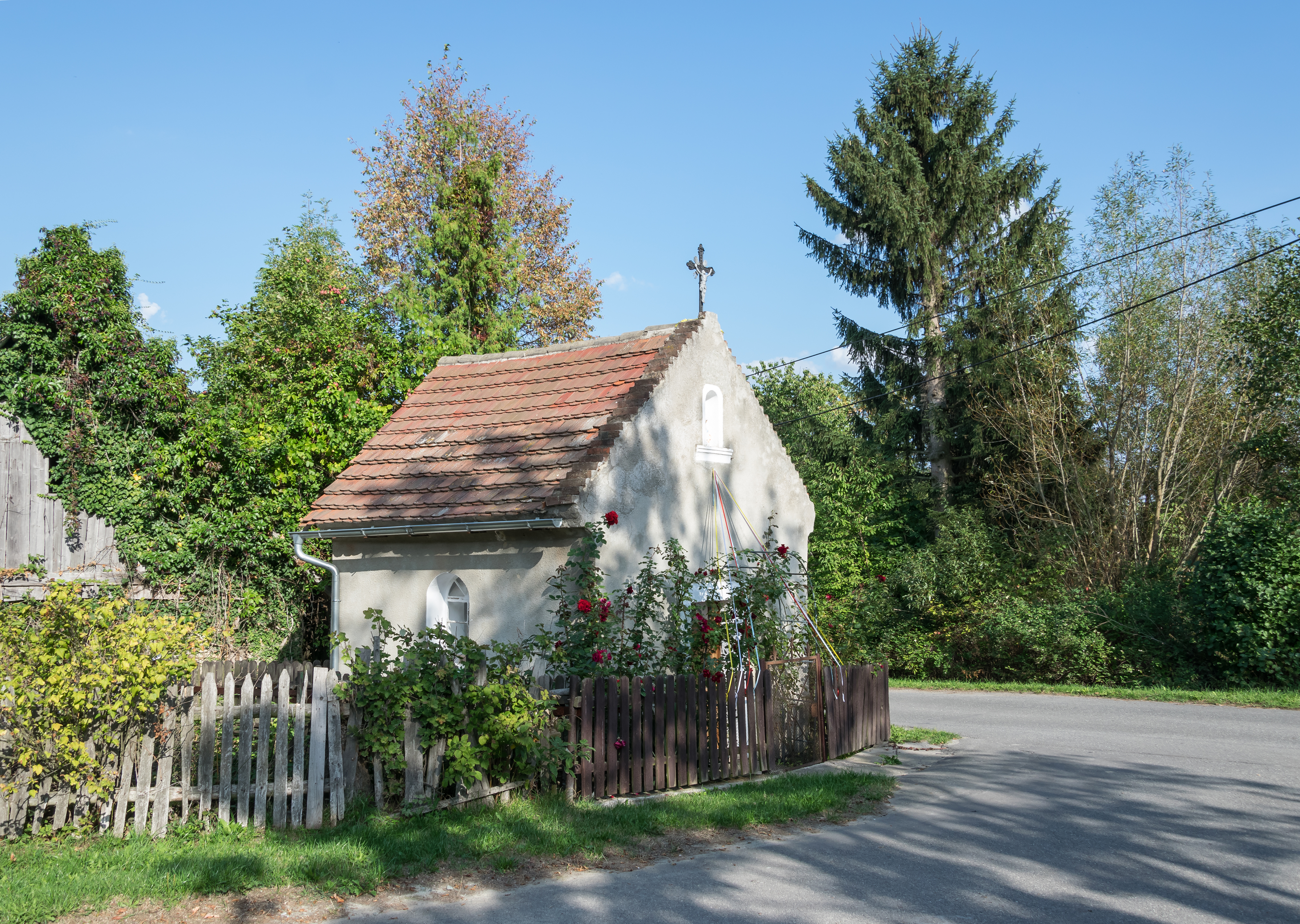
- Chapel

- Location within Poland
- Coordinates: 50°22′N 16°34′E
- Country: Poland
- Voivodeship: Lower Silesian
- County: Kłodzko
- Gmina: Bystrzyca Kłodzka
- Time zone: UTC+1 (CET)
  - Summer (DST): UTC+2 (CEST)
- Vehicle registration: DKL

Nowa Łomnica [ˈnɔva wɔmˈnit͡sa] is a village in the administrative district of Gmina Bystrzyca Kłodzka, within Kłodzko County, Lower Silesian Voivodeship, in south-western Poland.

== Etymology ==
The name is of Slavic origin, and is derived from the words łom or łomnica, which in turn come from the word łamać, meaning "to break".
