= Stara Bystrzyca =

- Village
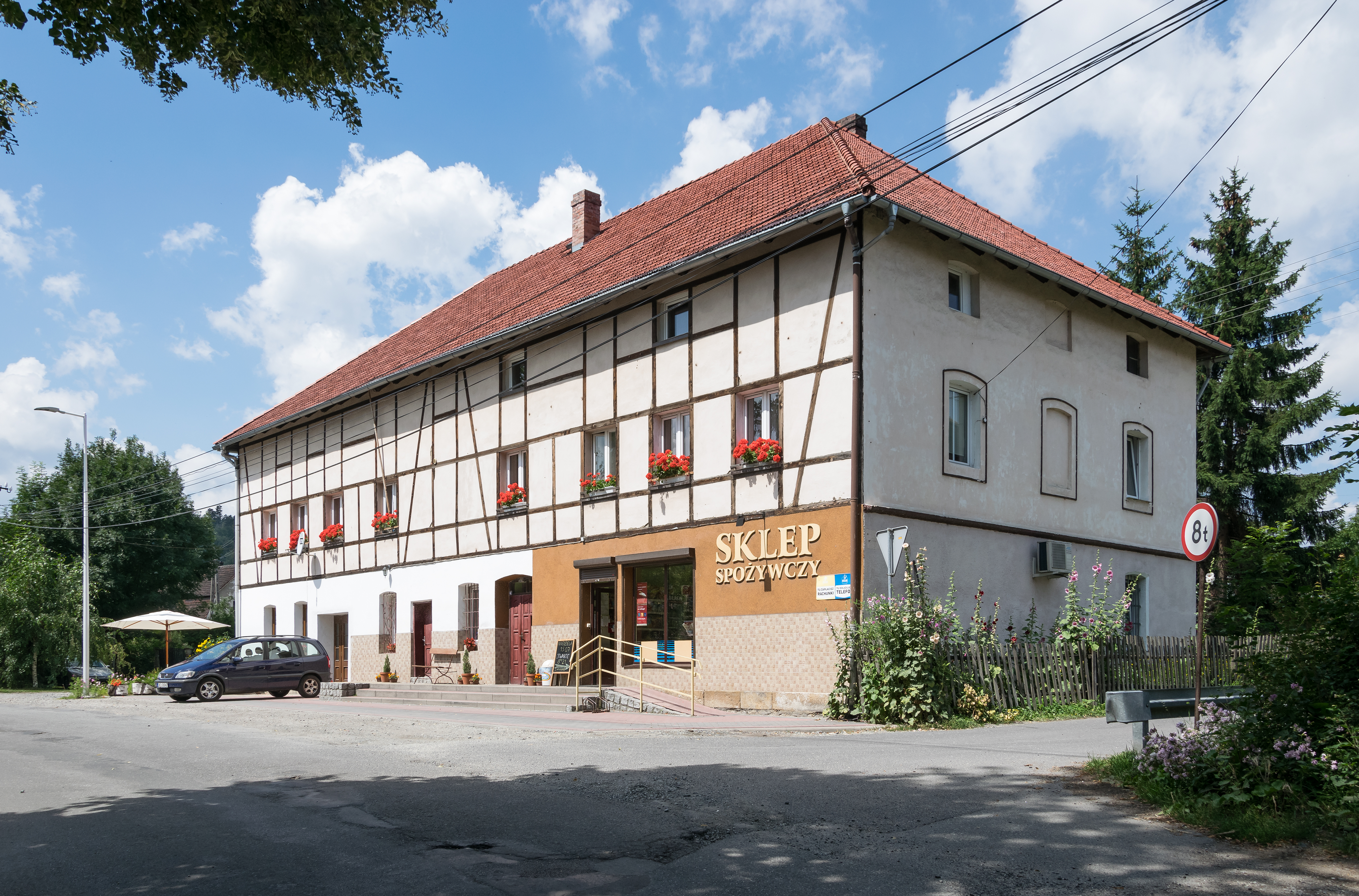
- House no. 48

- Location within Poland
- Coordinates: 50°18′11″N 16°36′50″E
- Country: Poland
- Voivodeship: Lower Silesian
- County: Kłodzko
- Gmina: Bystrzyca Kłodzka
- Elevation: 360 m (1,180 ft)
- Time zone: UTC+1 (CET)
  - Summer (DST): UTC+2 (CEST)
- Vehicle registration: DKL

Stara Bystrzyca [ˈstara bɨsˈtʂɨt͡sa] is a village in the administrative district of Gmina Bystrzyca Kłodzka, within Kłodzko County, Lower Silesian Voivodeship, in south-western Poland.
