= Wilkanów =

- Village
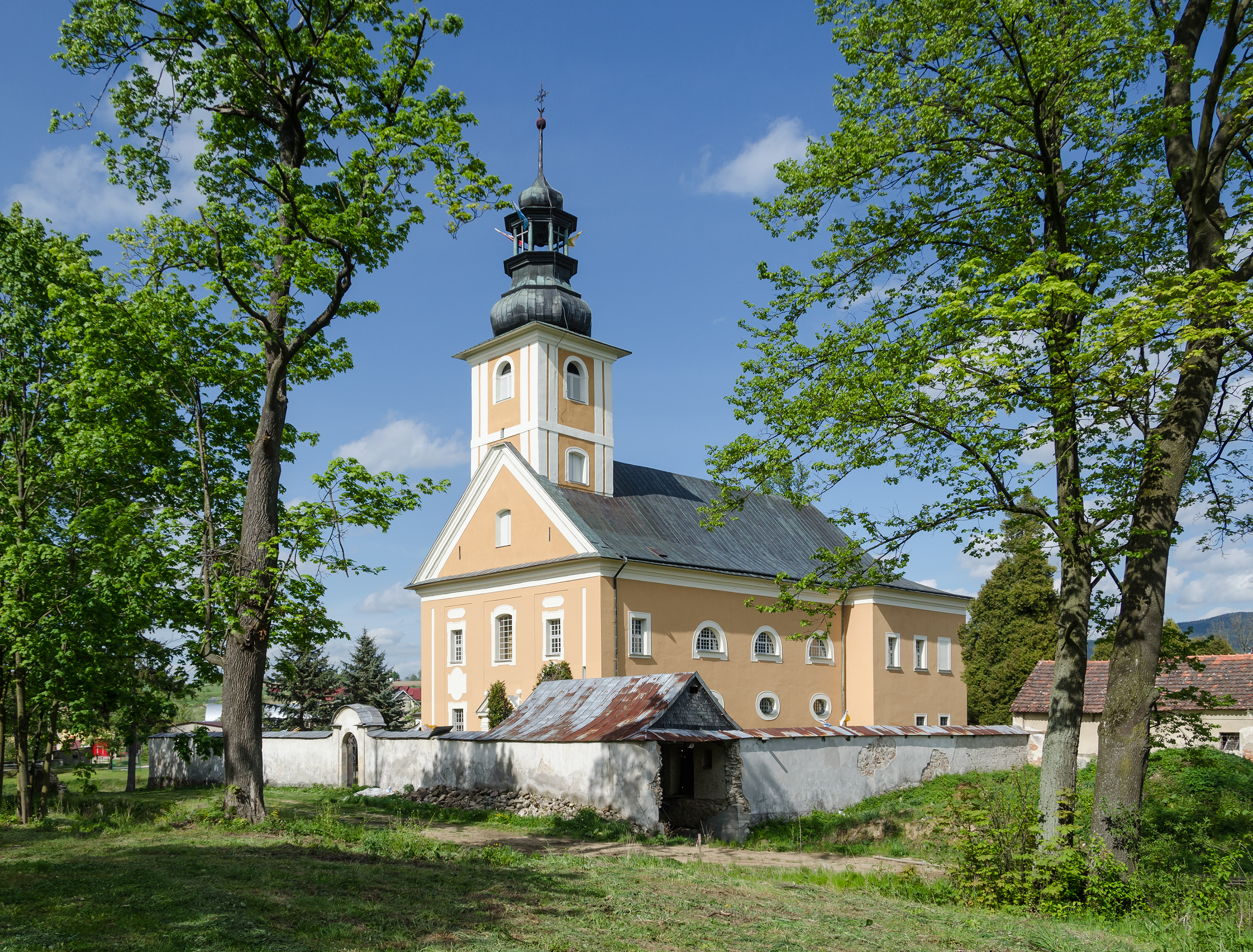
- Church of Saint George

- Location within Poland
- Coordinates: 50°14′51″N 16°41′21″E
- Country: Poland
- Voivodeship: Lower Silesian
- County: Kłodzko
- Gmina: Bystrzyca Kłodzka
- Elevation: 400 m (1,300 ft)
- Time zone: UTC+1 (CET)
  - Summer (DST): UTC+2 (CEST)
- Vehicle registration: DKL
- Website: http://wilkanow.republika.pl/

Wilkanów [vilˈkanuf] is a village in the administrative district of Gmina Bystrzyca Kłodzka, within Kłodzko County, Lower Silesian Voivodeship, in south-western Poland.
