= Rudawa, Kłodzko County =

Rudawa
- Village
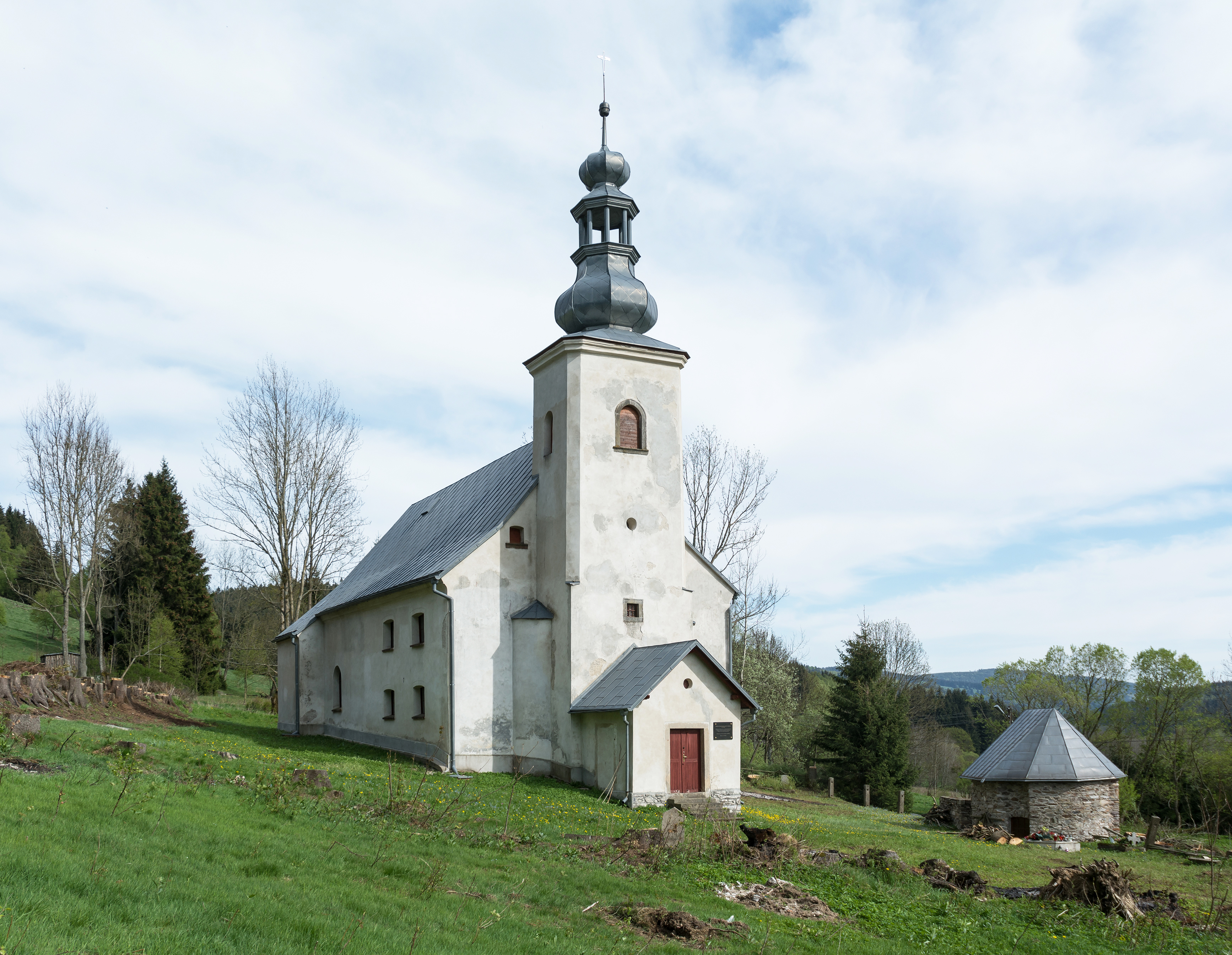

- Location within Poland
- Coordinates: 50°14′4″N 16°32′42″E
- Country: Poland
- Voivodeship: Lower Silesian
- County: Kłodzko
- Gmina: Bystrzyca Kłodzka
- Elevation: 625 m (2,051 ft)

Population
  - Total: 22

Rudawa [ruˈdava] is a village in the administrative district of Gmina Bystrzyca Kłodzka, within Kłodzko County, Lower Silesian Voivodeship, in south-western Poland, near the border with the Czech Republic.
