= Długopole Dolne =

- Village
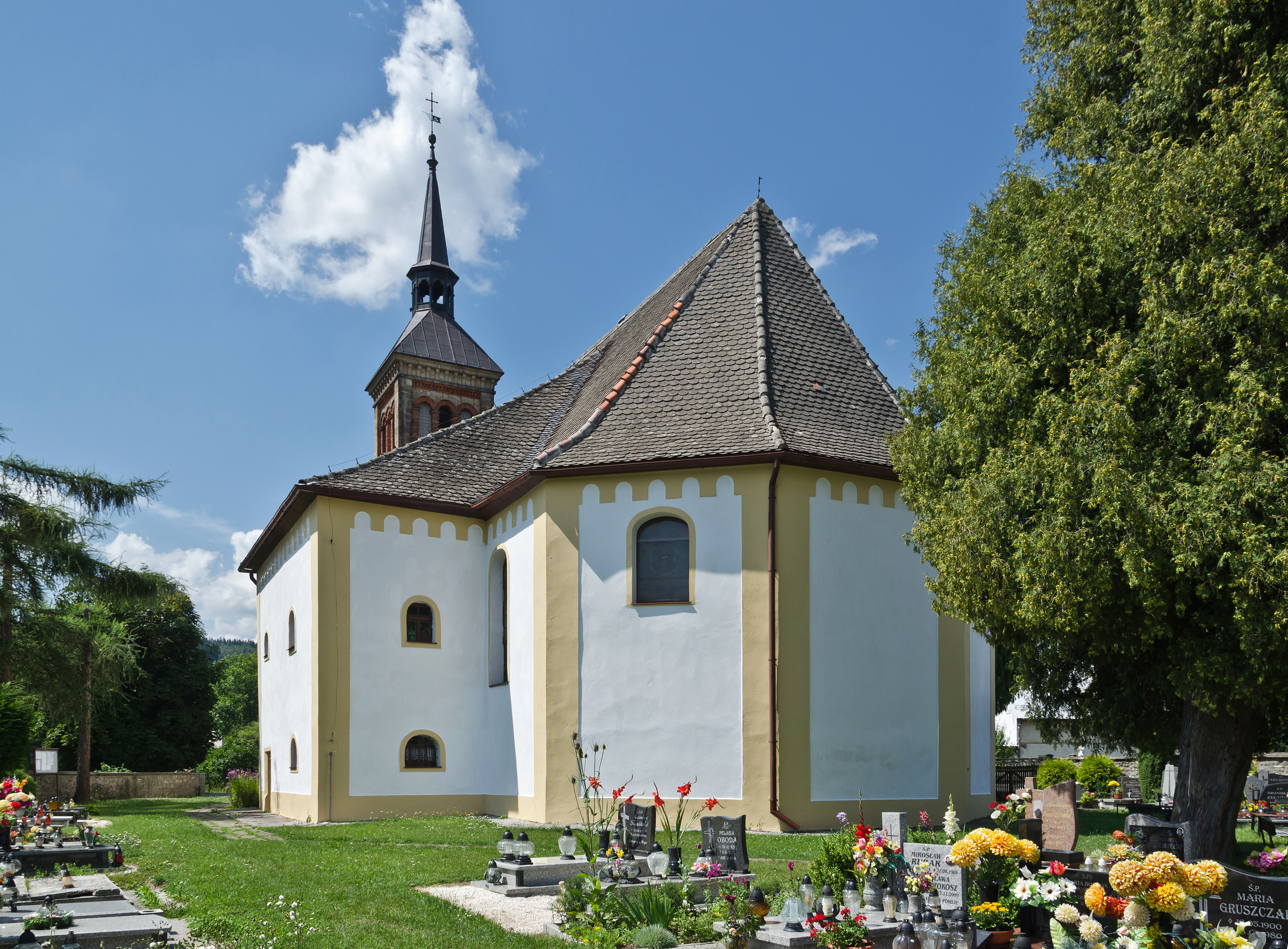

- Location within Poland
- Coordinates: 50°15′N 16°38′E
- Country: Poland
- Voivodeship: Lower Silesian
- County: Kłodzko
- Gmina: Bystrzyca Kłodzka

Długopole Dolne [dwuɡɔˈpɔlɛ ˈdɔlnɛ] is a village in the administrative district of Gmina Bystrzyca Kłodzka, within Kłodzko County, Lower Silesian Voivodeship, in south-western Poland.
