= Topolice, Lower Silesian Voivodeship =

Topolice
- Village
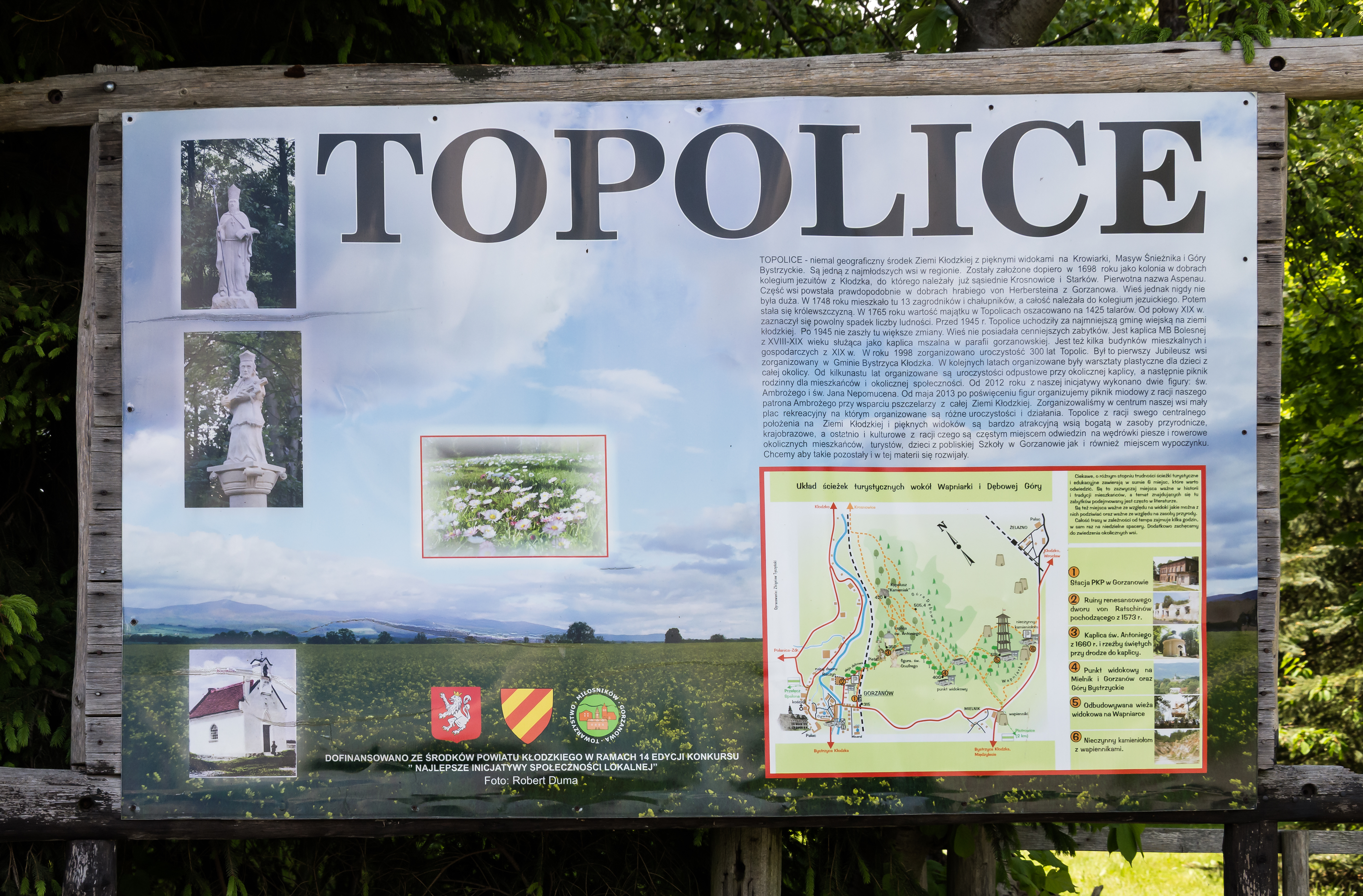

- Location within Poland
- Coordinates: 50°22′04″N 16°36′10″E
- Country: Poland
- Voivodeship: Lower Silesian
- County: Kłodzko
- Gmina: Bystrzyca Kłodzka

Topolice [tɔpɔˈlit͡sɛ] is a village in the administrative district of Gmina Bystrzyca Kłodzka, within Kłodzko County, Lower Silesian Voivodeship, in south-western Poland.
