= Marcinków, Lower Silesian Voivodeship =

Marcinków
- Village
- Location within Poland
- Coordinates: 50°16′47″N 16°46′11″E
- Country: Poland
- Voivodeship: Lower Silesian
- County: Kłodzko
- Gmina: Bystrzyca Kłodzka
- Population: 2

Marcinków [marˈt͡ɕiŋkuf] is a village in the administrative district of Gmina Bystrzyca Kłodzka, within Kłodzko County, Lower Silesian Voivodeship, in south-western Poland.
