= Długopole-Zdrój =

- Village
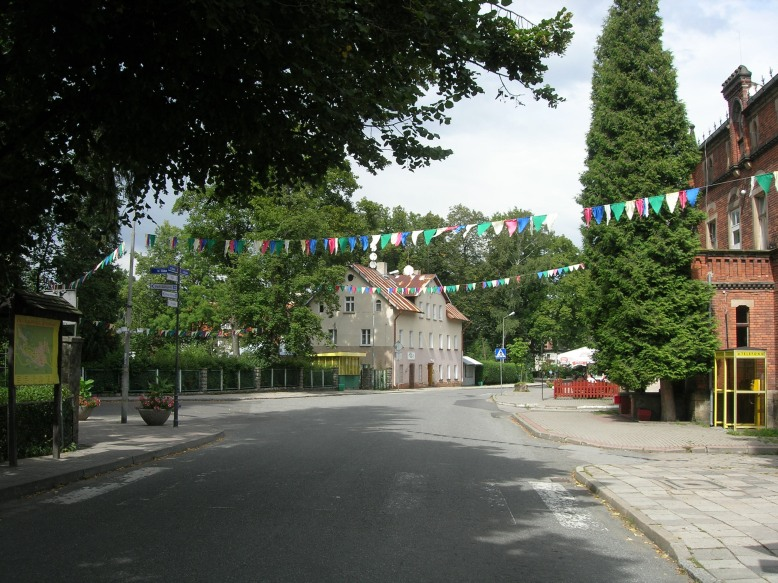

- Location within Poland
- Coordinates: 50°14′52″N 16°37′52″E
- Country: Poland
- Voivodeship: Lower Silesian
- County: Kłodzko
- Gmina: Bystrzyca Kłodzka

Population
  - Total: 540
- Time zone: UTC+1 (CET)
  - Summer (DST): UTC+2 (CEST)
- Vehicle registration: DKL

Długopole-Zdrój [dwuɡɔˈpɔlɛ ˈzdrui̯] is a spa village in the administrative district of Gmina Bystrzyca Kłodzka, within Kłodzko County, Lower Silesian Voivodeship, in south-western Poland.

== History ==
During World War II, the Germans established and operated a forced labour subcamp of the Stalag VIII-A prisoner-of-war camp in the village.
