= Szklary, Kłodzko County =

Szklary
- Village
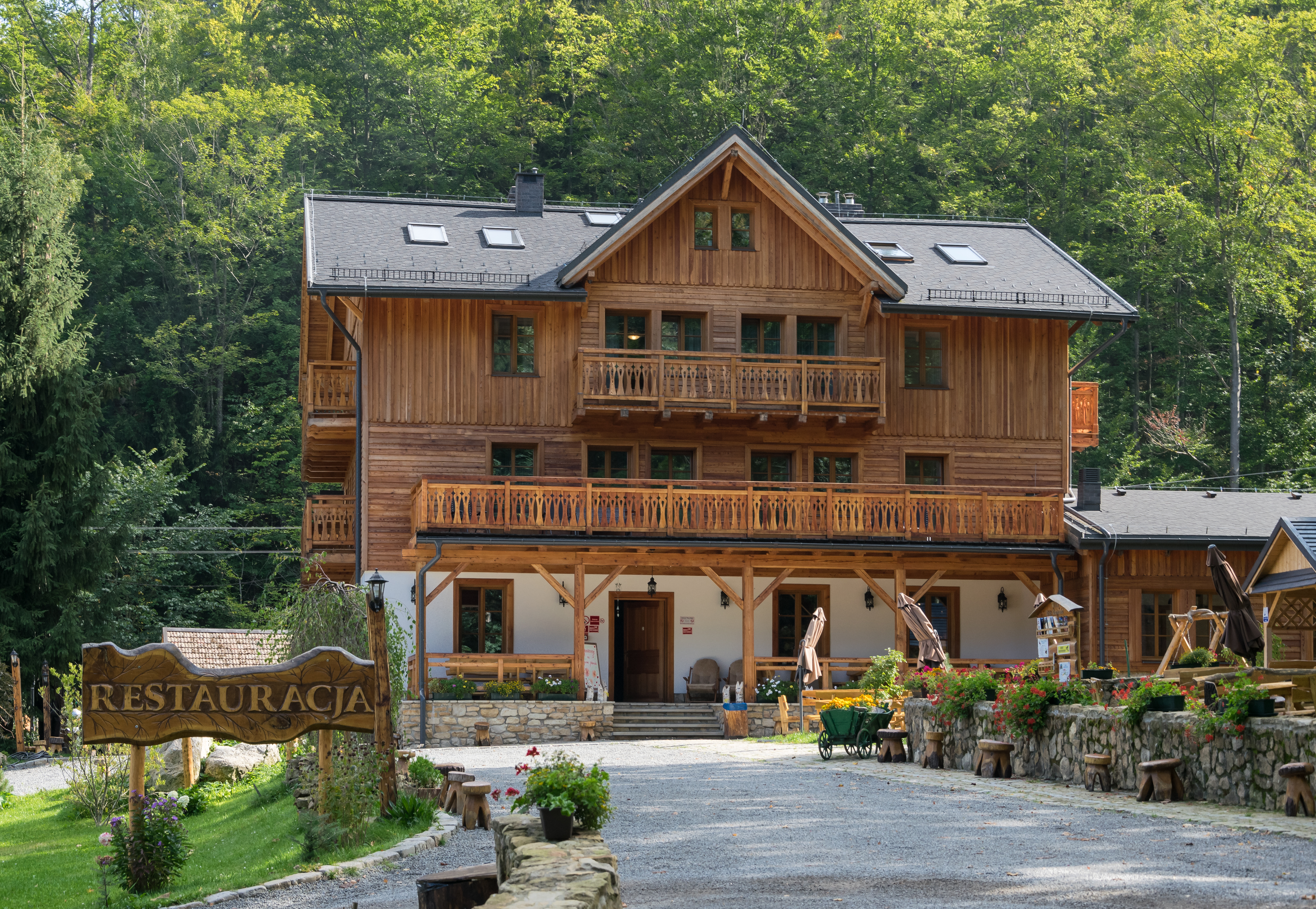

- Location within Poland
- Coordinates: 50°14′51″N 16°43′33″E
- Country: Poland
- Voivodeship: Lower Silesian
- County: Kłodzko
- Gmina: Bystrzyca Kłodzka

Szklary [ˈʂklarɨ] is a village in the administrative district of Gmina Bystrzyca Kłodzka, within Kłodzko County, Lower Silesian Voivodeship, in south-western Poland.
