= Starkówek =

- Village
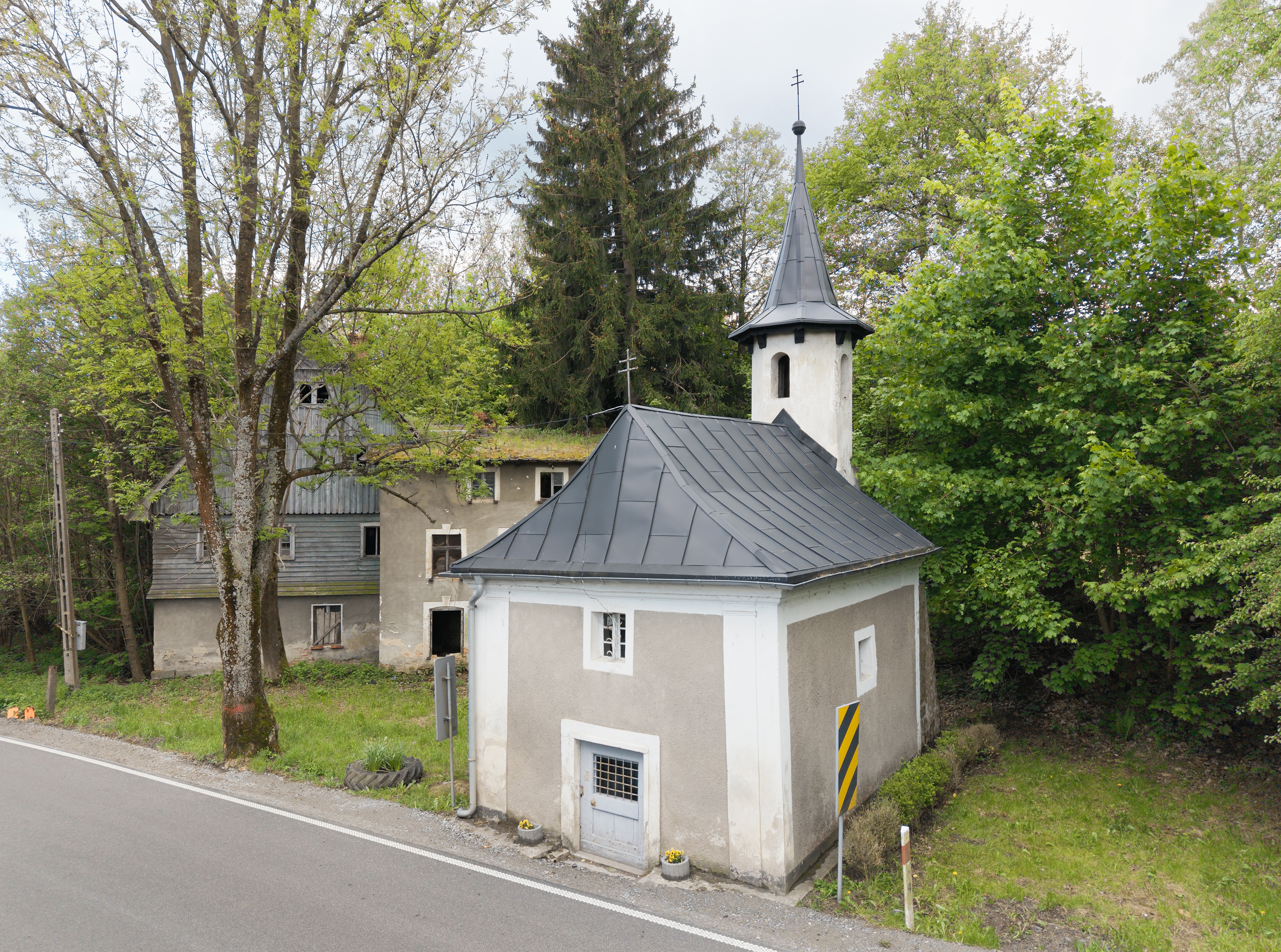

- Location within Poland
- Coordinates: 50°22′N 16°32′E
- Country: Poland
- Voivodeship: Lower Silesian
- County: Kłodzko
- Gmina: Bystrzyca Kłodzka

Starkówek [starˈkuvɛk] is a village in the administrative district of Gmina Bystrzyca Kłodzka, within Kłodzko County, Lower Silesian Voivodeship, in south-western Poland. Its Geography ID is 3084836.
