= Piotrowice, Kłodzko County =

Piotrowice
- Village
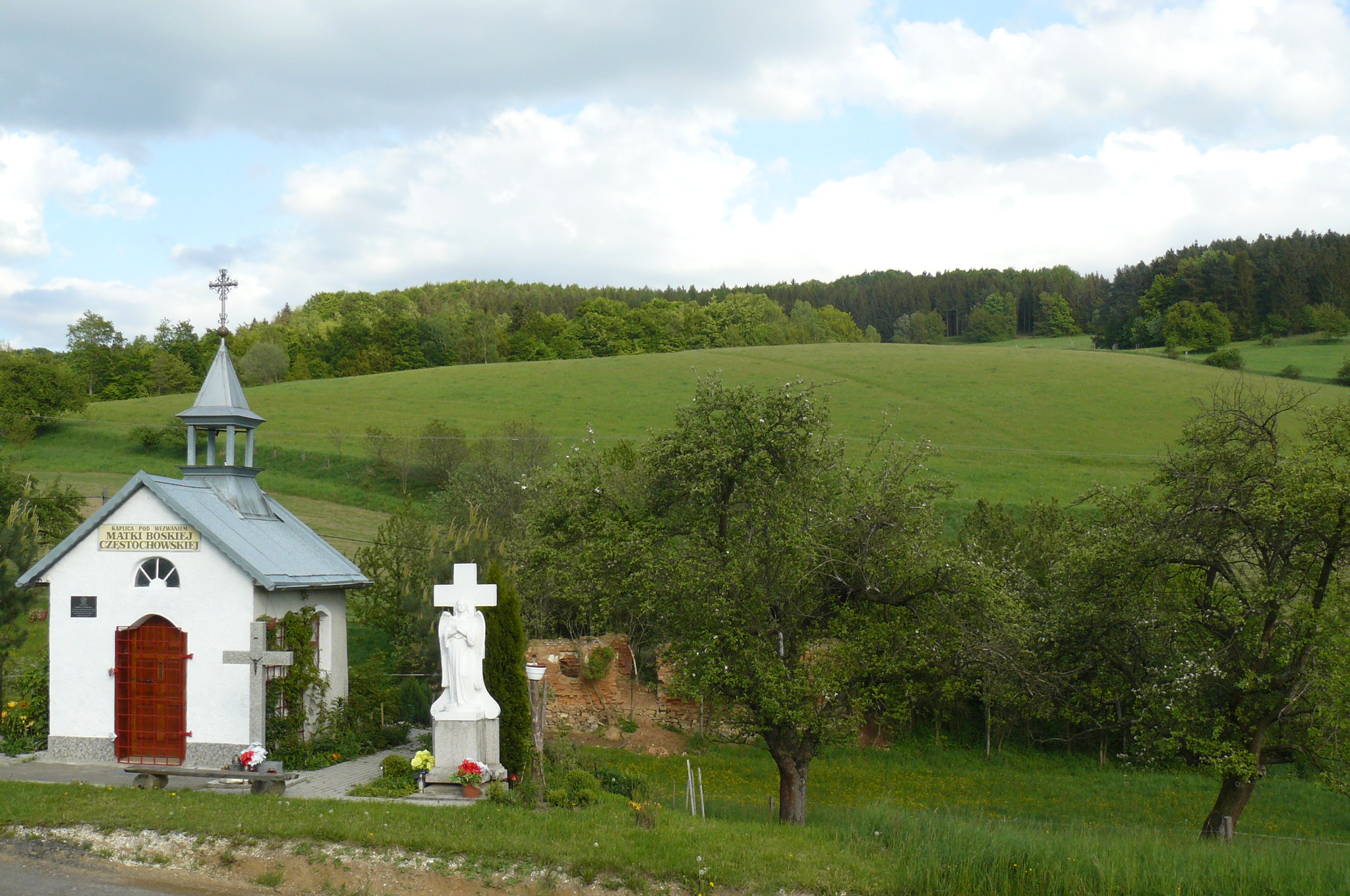

- Location within Poland
- Coordinates: 50°20′02″N 16°41′24″E
- Country: Poland
- Voivodeship: Lower Silesian
- County: Kłodzko
- Gmina: Bystrzyca Kłodzka

Piotrowice [pjɔtrɔˈvit͡sɛ] is a village in the administrative district of Gmina Bystrzyca Kłodzka, within Kłodzko County, Lower Silesian Voivodeship, in southwestern Poland.
