= Nowy Waliszów =

- Village
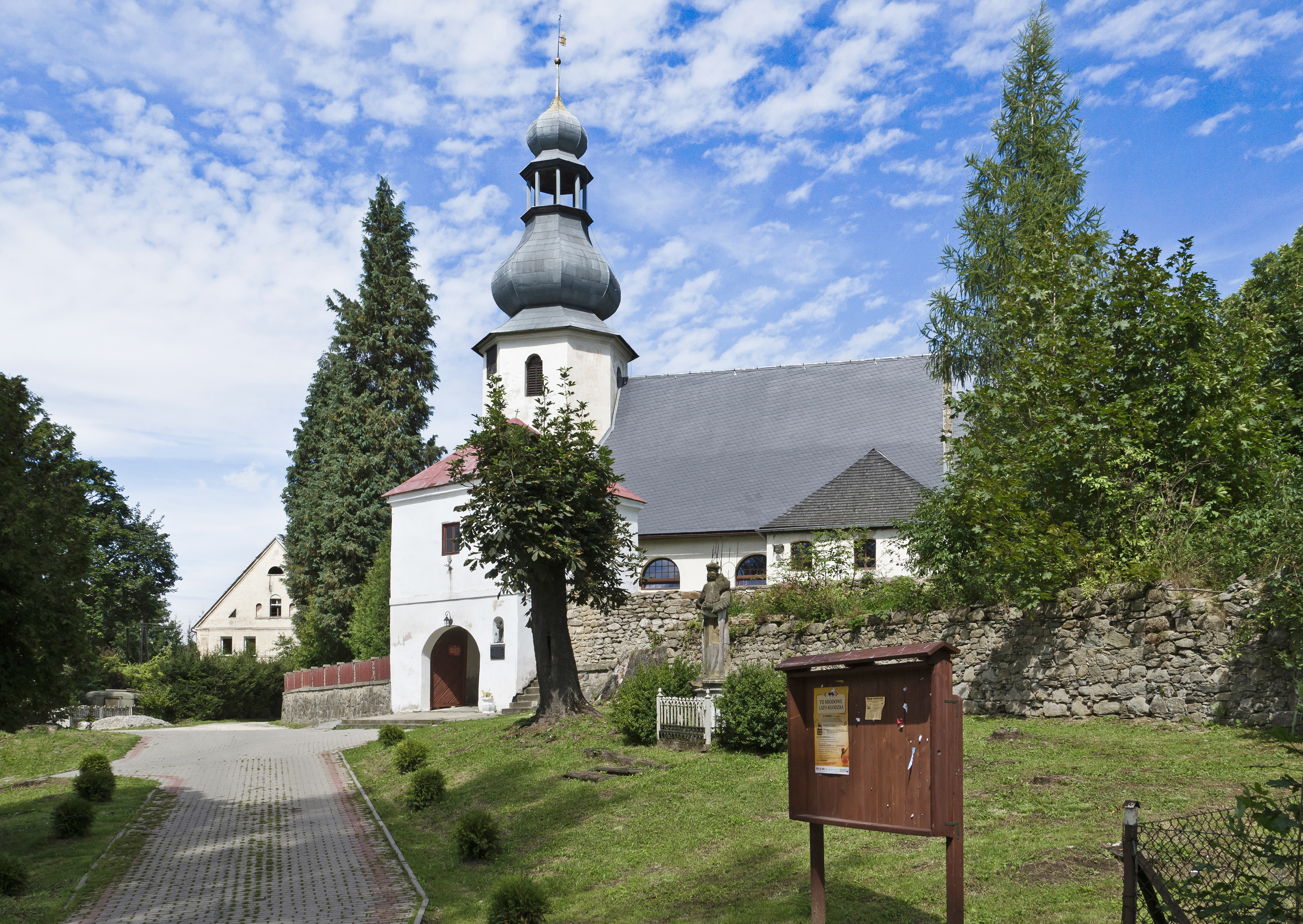

- Location within Poland
- Coordinates: 50°18′55″N 16°43′53″E
- Country: Poland
- Voivodeship: Lower Silesian
- County: Kłodzko
- Gmina: Bystrzyca Kłodzka

Nowy Waliszów [ˈnɔvɨ vaˈliʂuf] is a village in the administrative district of Gmina Bystrzyca Kłodzka, within Kłodzko County, Lower Silesian Voivodeship, in south-western Poland.
