= Zabłocie, Kłodzko County =

Zabłocie
- Village
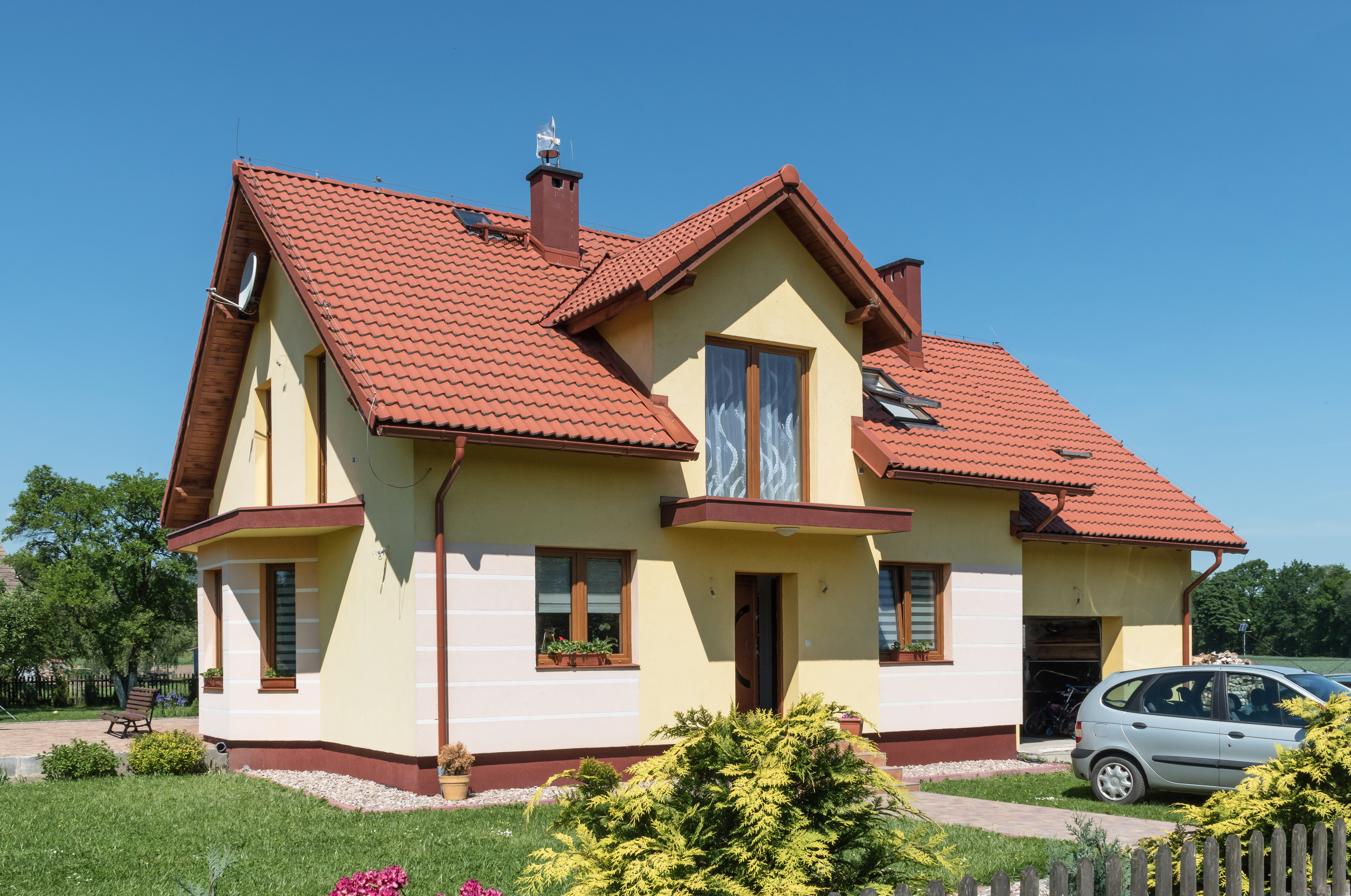

- Location within Poland
- Coordinates: 50°19′09″N 16°39′23″E
- Country: Poland
- Voivodeship: Lower Silesian
- County: Kłodzko
- Gmina: Bystrzyca Kłodzka

Population
  - Total: 180

Zabłocie [zaˈbwɔt͡ɕɛ] is a village in the administrative district of Gmina Bystrzyca Kłodzka, within Kłodzko County, Lower Silesian Voivodeship, in south-western Poland.
