= Wójtowice, Lower Silesian Voivodeship =

Wójtowice
- Village
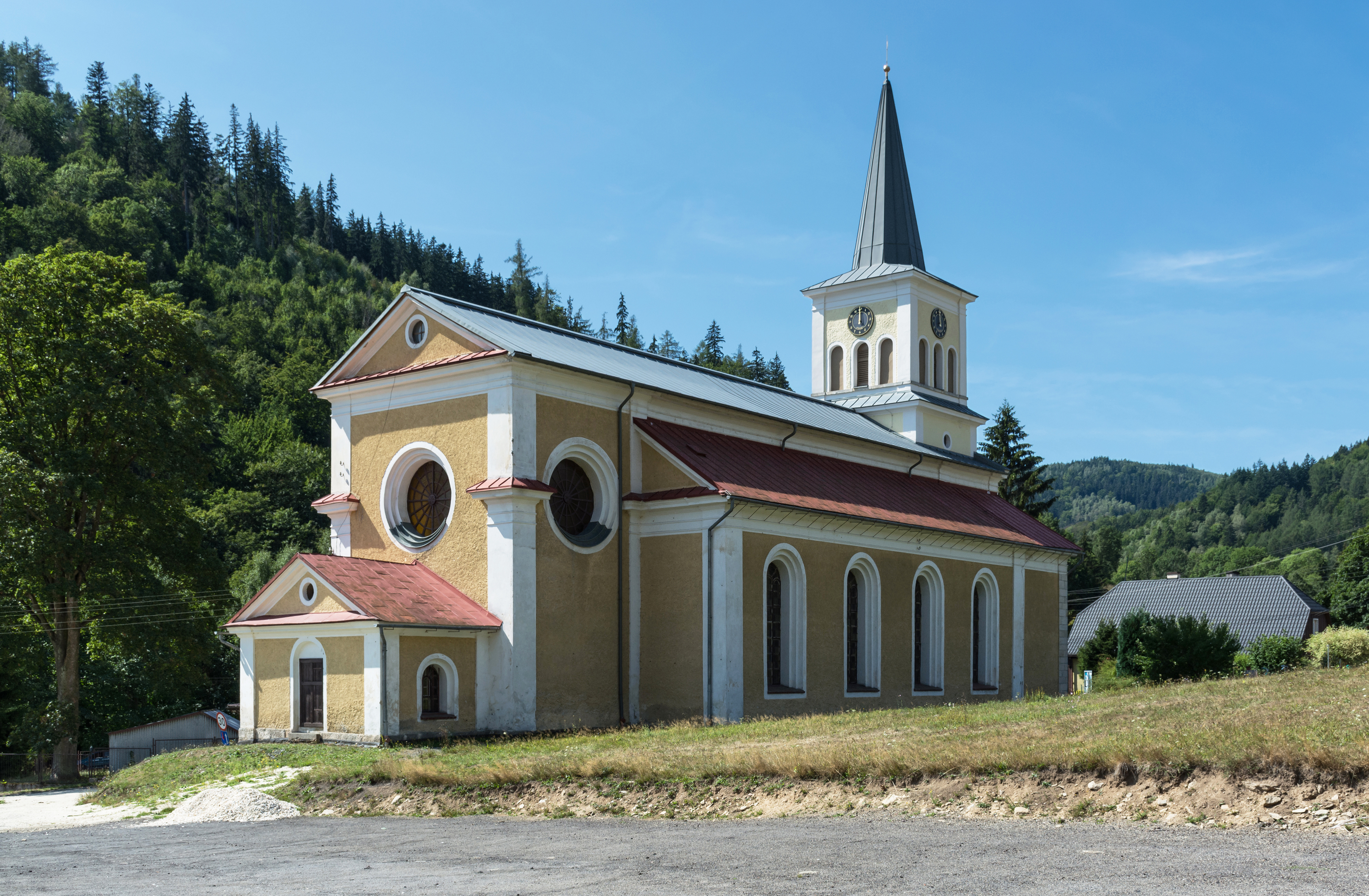
- Church of Saint Mary Magdalene

- Location within Poland
- Coordinates: 50°18′16″N 16°33′50″E
- Country: Poland
- Voivodeship: Lower Silesian
- County: Kłodzko
- Gmina: Bystrzyca Kłodzka
- Time zone: UTC+1 (CET)
  - Summer (DST): UTC+2 (CEST)
- Vehicle registration: DKL

Wójtowice [vui̯tɔˈvit͡sɛ] is a village in the administrative district of Gmina Bystrzyca Kłodzka, within Kłodzko County, Lower Silesian Voivodeship, in south-western Poland.
