= Poręba, Lower Silesian Voivodeship =

Poręba
- Village
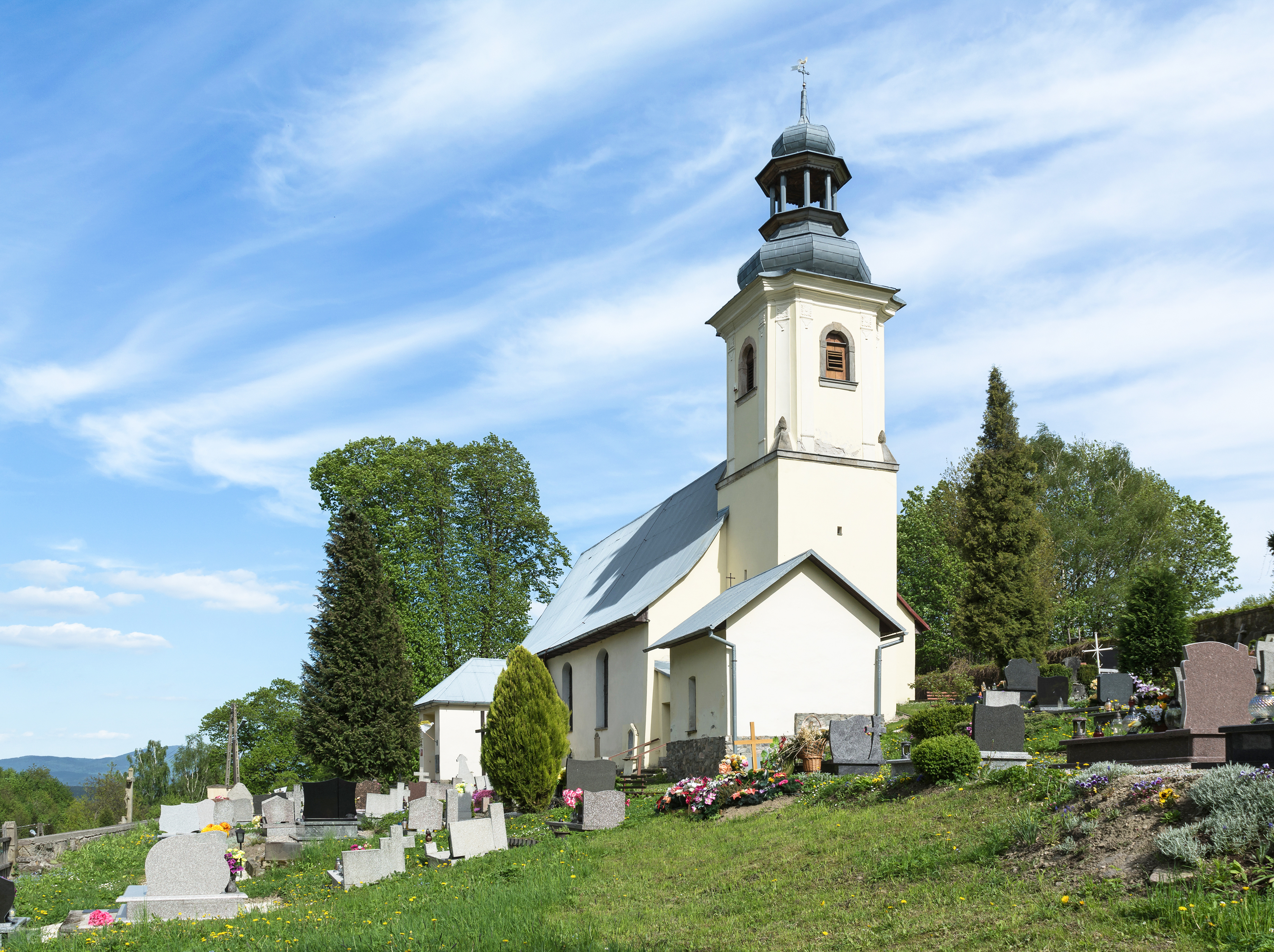
- Saint Sebastian church in Poręba

- Location within Poland
- Coordinates: 50°13′59″N 16°35′54″E
- Country: Poland
- Voivodeship: Lower Silesian
- County: Kłodzko
- Gmina: Bystrzyca Kłodzka
- Time zone: UTC+1 (CET)
  - Summer (DST): UTC+2 (CEST)
- Vehicle registration: DKL

Poręba [pɔˈrɛmba] is a village in the administrative district of Gmina Bystrzyca Kłodzka, within Kłodzko County, Lower Silesian Voivodeship, in south-western Poland.

== History ==
In the Middle Ages, the village was at various times part of Poland and Bohemia. In the 18th century it was annexed by Prussia, and from 1871 it was also part of Germany. During World War II, the German administration operated the E432 forced labour subcamp of the Stalag VIII-B/344 prisoner-of-war camp in the village. Following Germany's defeat in the war, in 1945, the area became again part of Poland.
