= Stary Waliszów =

- Village
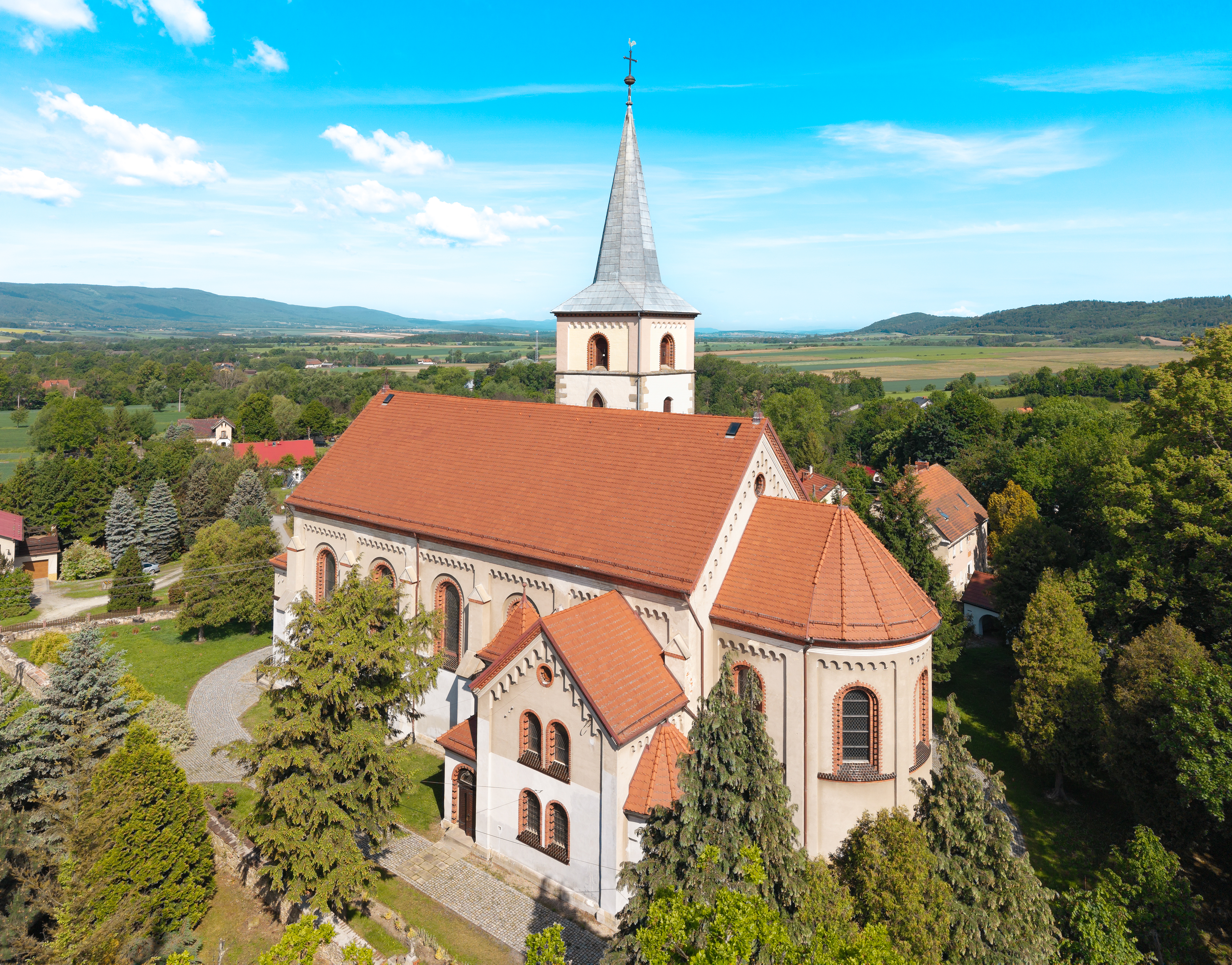
- Church of Saint Lawrence

- Location within Poland
- Coordinates: 50°19′17″N 16°40′34″E
- Country: Poland
- Voivodeship: Lower Silesian
- County: Kłodzko
- Gmina: Bystrzyca Kłodzka
- Website: http://www.starywaliszow.republika.pl

Stary Waliszów [ˈstarɨ vaˈliʂuf] is a village in the administrative district of Gmina Bystrzyca Kłodzka, within Kłodzko County, Lower Silesian Voivodeship, in south-western Poland.
