= Wyszki, Lower Silesian Voivodeship =

Wyszki
- Village
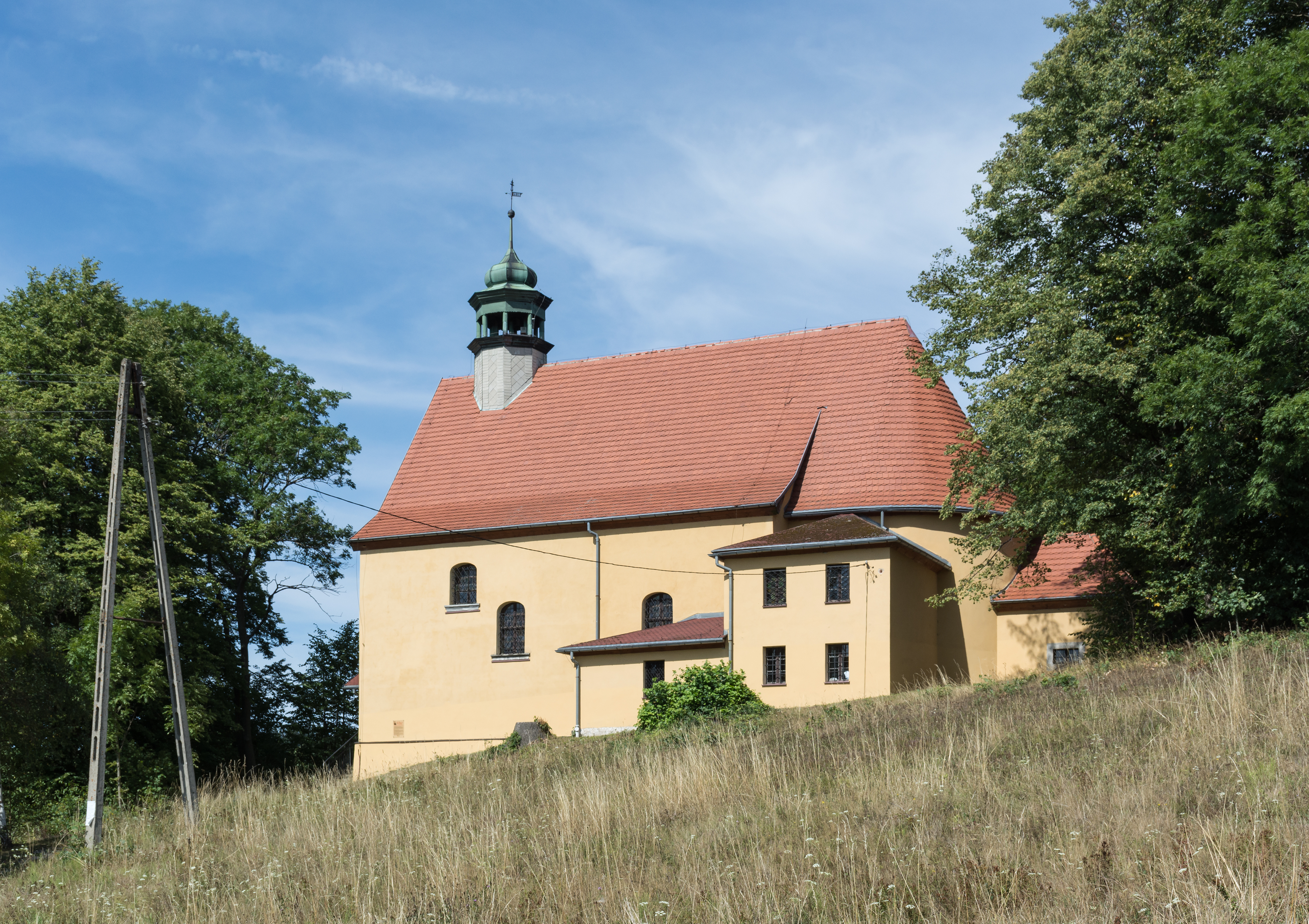
- Saint John the Baptist church in Wyszki

- Location within Poland
- Coordinates: 50°16′N 16°36′E
- Country: Poland
- Voivodeship: Lower Silesian
- County: Kłodzko
- Gmina: Bystrzyca Kłodzka
- Time zone: UTC+1 (CET)
  - Summer (DST): UTC+2 (CEST)
- Vehicle registration: DKL

Wyszki [ˈvɨʂki] is a village in the administrative district of Gmina Bystrzyca Kłodzka, within Kłodzko County, Lower Silesian Voivodeship, in south-western Poland.
