= Marianówka, Lower Silesian Voivodeship =

Marianówka
- Village
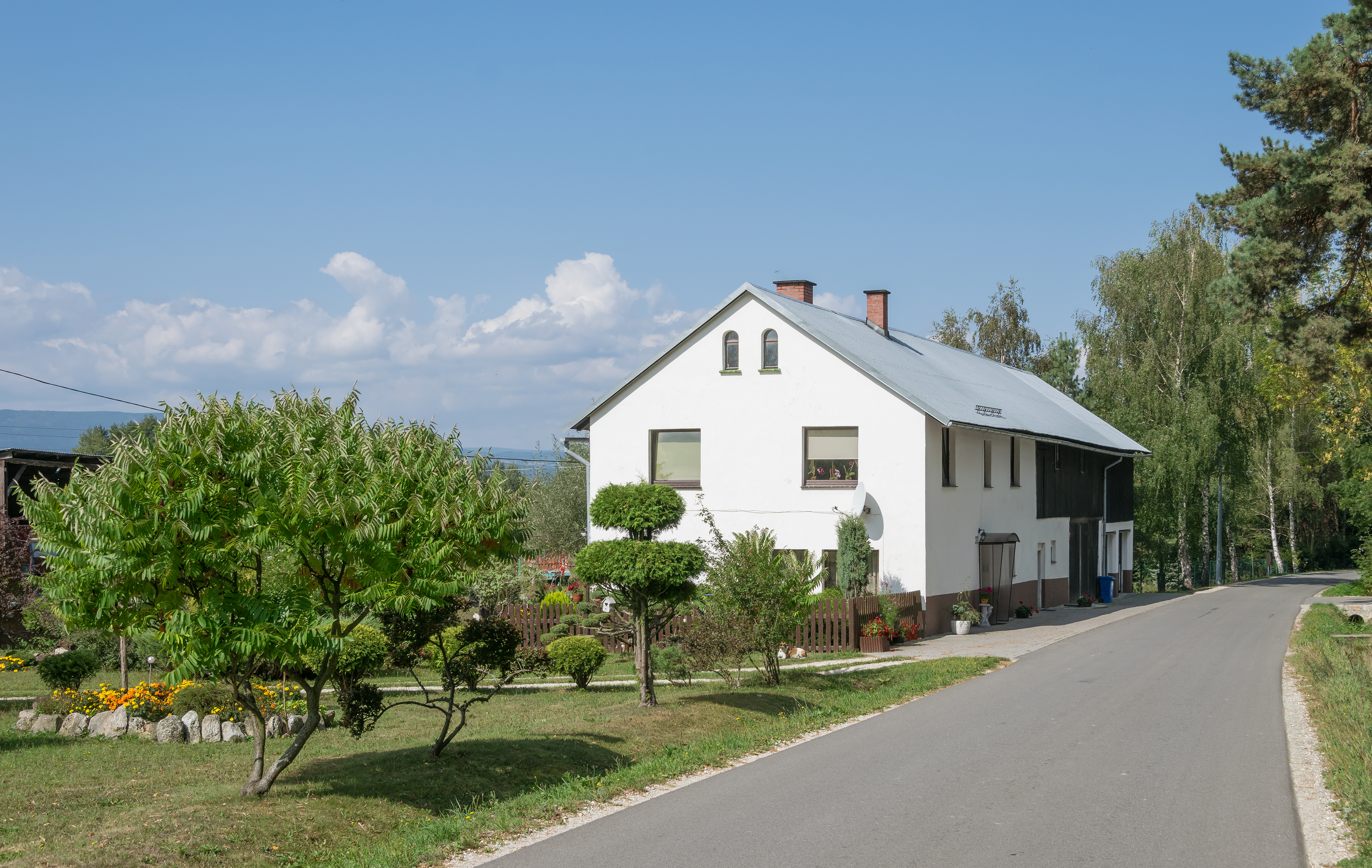

- Location within Poland
- Coordinates: 50°16′16″N 16°42′51″E
- Country: Poland
- Voivodeship: Lower Silesian
- County: Kłodzko
- Gmina: Bystrzyca Kłodzka
- Time zone: UTC+1 (CET)
  - Summer (DST): UTC+2 (CEST)
- Vehicle registration: DKL

Marianówka [marjaˈnufka] is a village in the administrative district of Gmina Bystrzyca Kłodzka, within Kłodzko County, Lower Silesian Voivodeship, in south-western Poland.
