= Stara Łomnica =

- Village
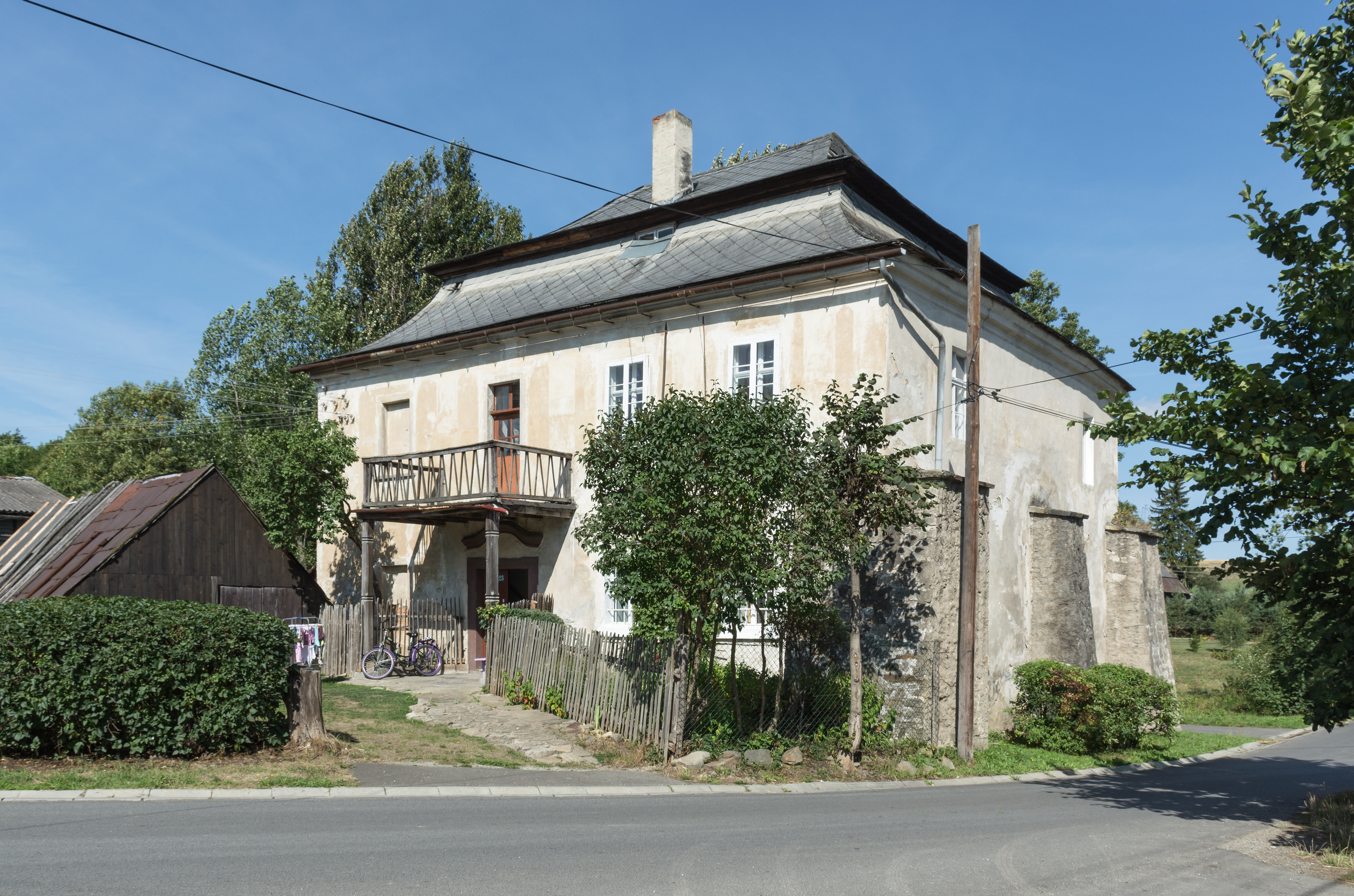
- Lower Manor

- Location within Poland
- Coordinates: 50°21′04″N 16°35′29″E
- Country: Poland
- Voivodeship: Lower Silesian
- County: Kłodzko
- Gmina: Bystrzyca Kłodzka

Population
  - Total: 800
- Time zone: UTC+1 (CET)
  - Summer (DST): UTC+2 (CEST)
- Vehicle registration: DKL

Stara Łomnica [ˈstara wɔmˈnit͡sa] is a village in the administrative district of Gmina Bystrzyca Kłodzka, within Kłodzko County, Lower Silesian Voivodeship, in south-western Poland.

== Etymology ==
The name is of Slavic origin, and is derived from the words łom or łomnica, which in turn come from the word łamać, meaning "to break".
