= Mielnik, Lower Silesian Voivodeship =

Mielnik
- Village
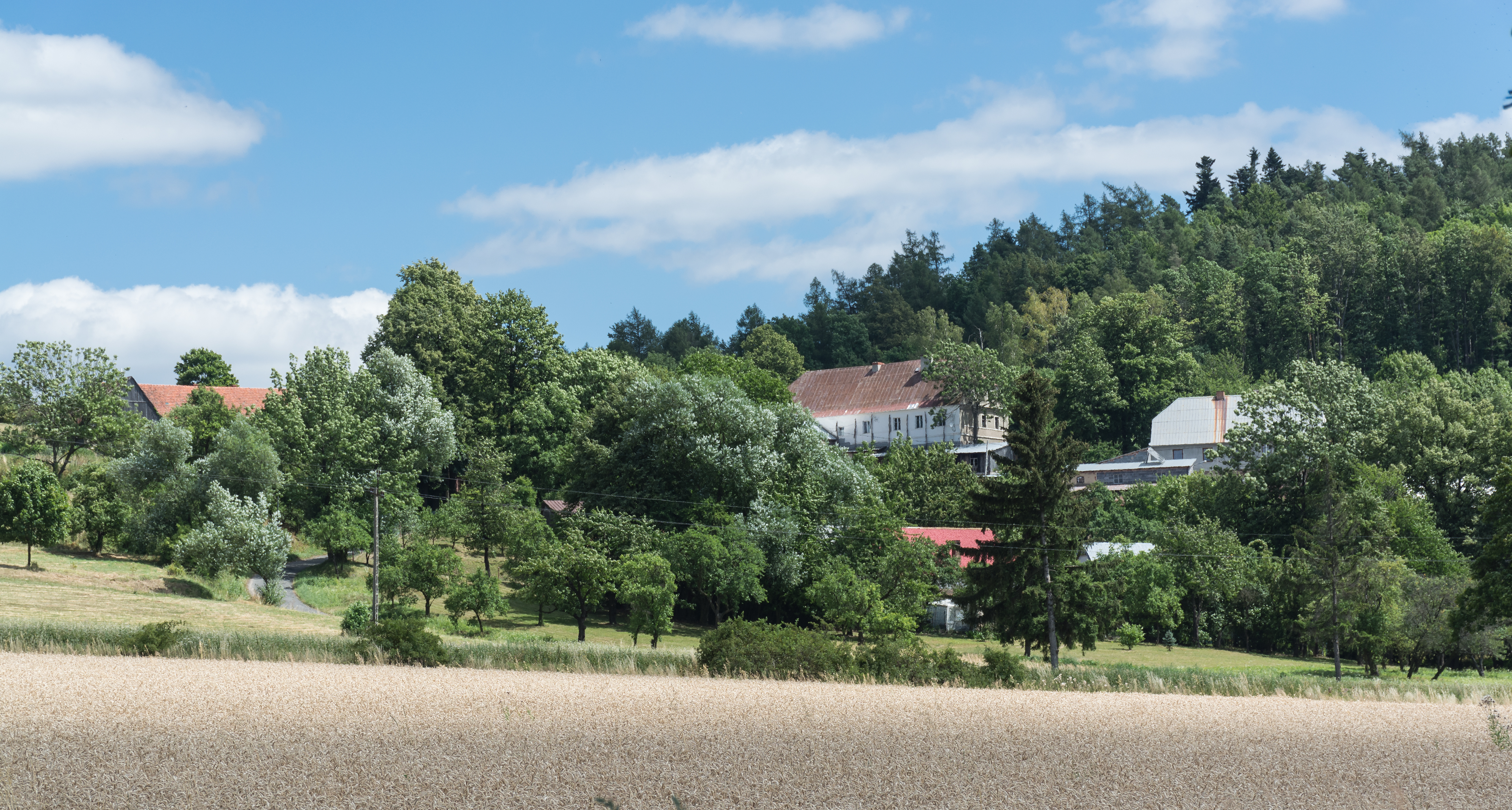
- Mielnik

- Location within Poland
- Coordinates: 50°21′7″N 16°39′54″E
- Country: Poland
- Voivodeship: Lower Silesian
- County: Kłodzko
- Gmina: Bystrzyca Kłodzka

Mielnik [ˈmjɛlnik] is a village in the administrative district of Gmina Bystrzyca Kłodzka, within Kłodzko County, Lower Silesian Voivodeship, in south-western Poland.
