= Mostowice =

- Village
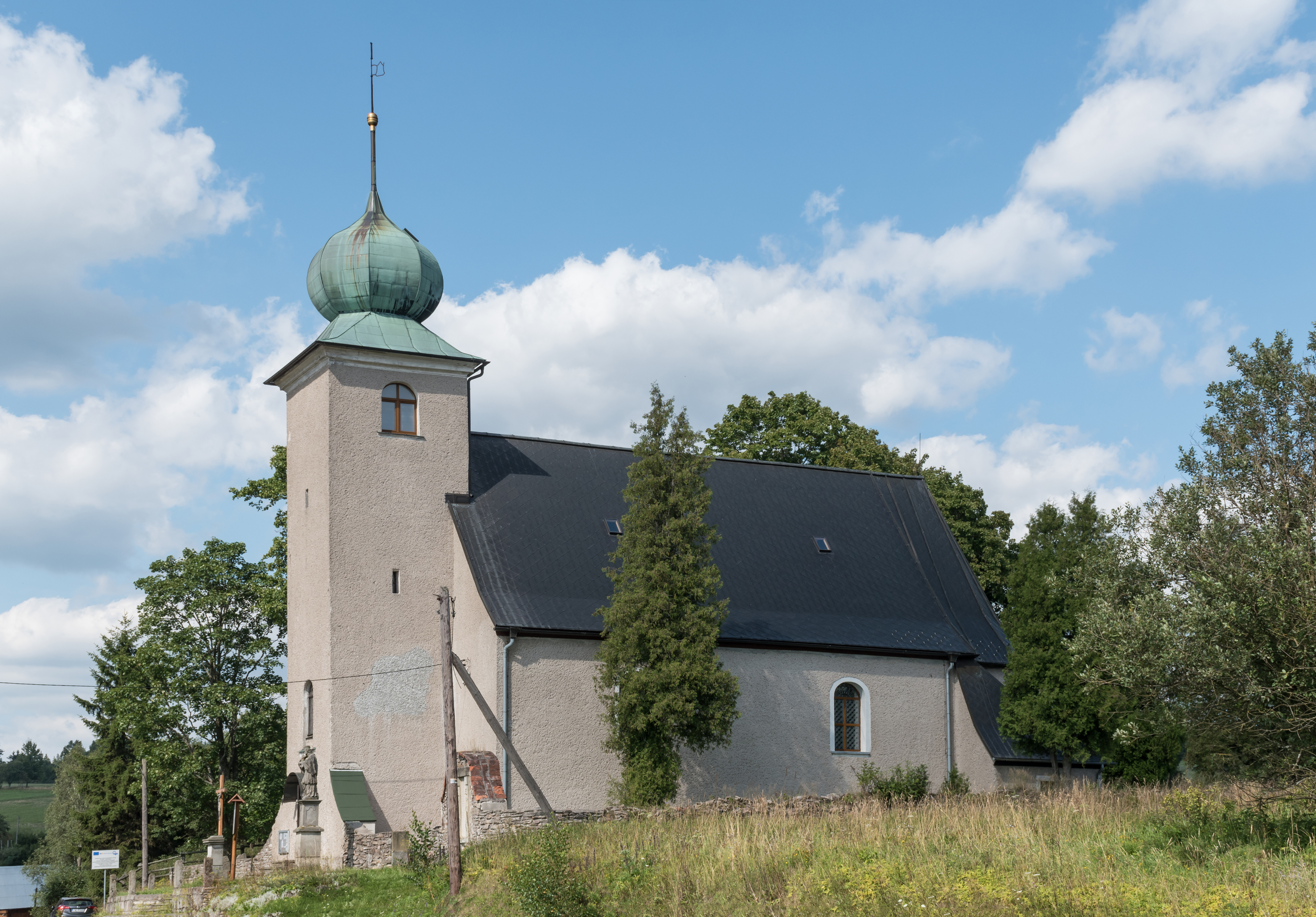
- Church of the Nativity of the Virgin Mary

- Location within Poland
- Coordinates: 50°16′N 16°28′E
- Country: Poland
- Voivodeship: Lower Silesian
- County: Kłodzko
- Gmina: Bystrzyca Kłodzka
- Elevation (max.): 720 m (2,360 ft)

Mostowice [mɔstɔˈvit͡sɛ] is a village in the administrative district of Gmina Bystrzyca Kłodzka, within Kłodzko County, Lower Silesian Voivodeship, in south-western Poland, near the border with the Czech Republic.
