= Poniatów, Lower Silesian Voivodeship =

Poniatów
- Village
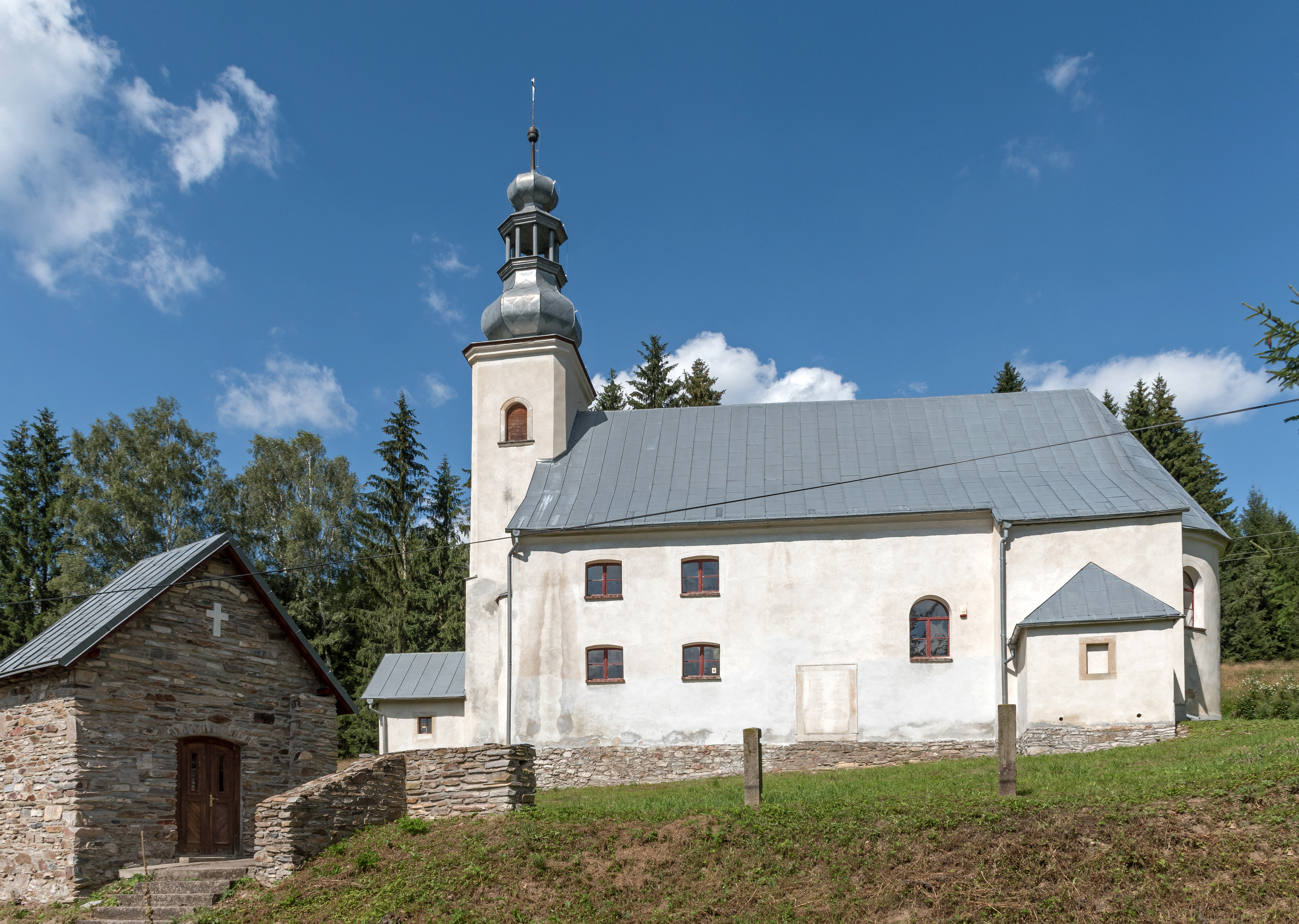
- Church of the Exaltation of the Holy Cross

- Location within Poland
- Coordinates: 50°13′12″N 16°34′0″E
- Country: Poland
- Voivodeship: Lower Silesian
- County: Kłodzko
- Gmina: Bystrzyca Kłodzka

Population
  - Total: 3

Poniatów [pɔˈɲatuf] is a village in the administrative district of Gmina Bystrzyca Kłodzka, within Kłodzko County, Lower Silesian Voivodeship, in south-western Poland, near the border with the Czech Republic.
