= Idzików =

- Village
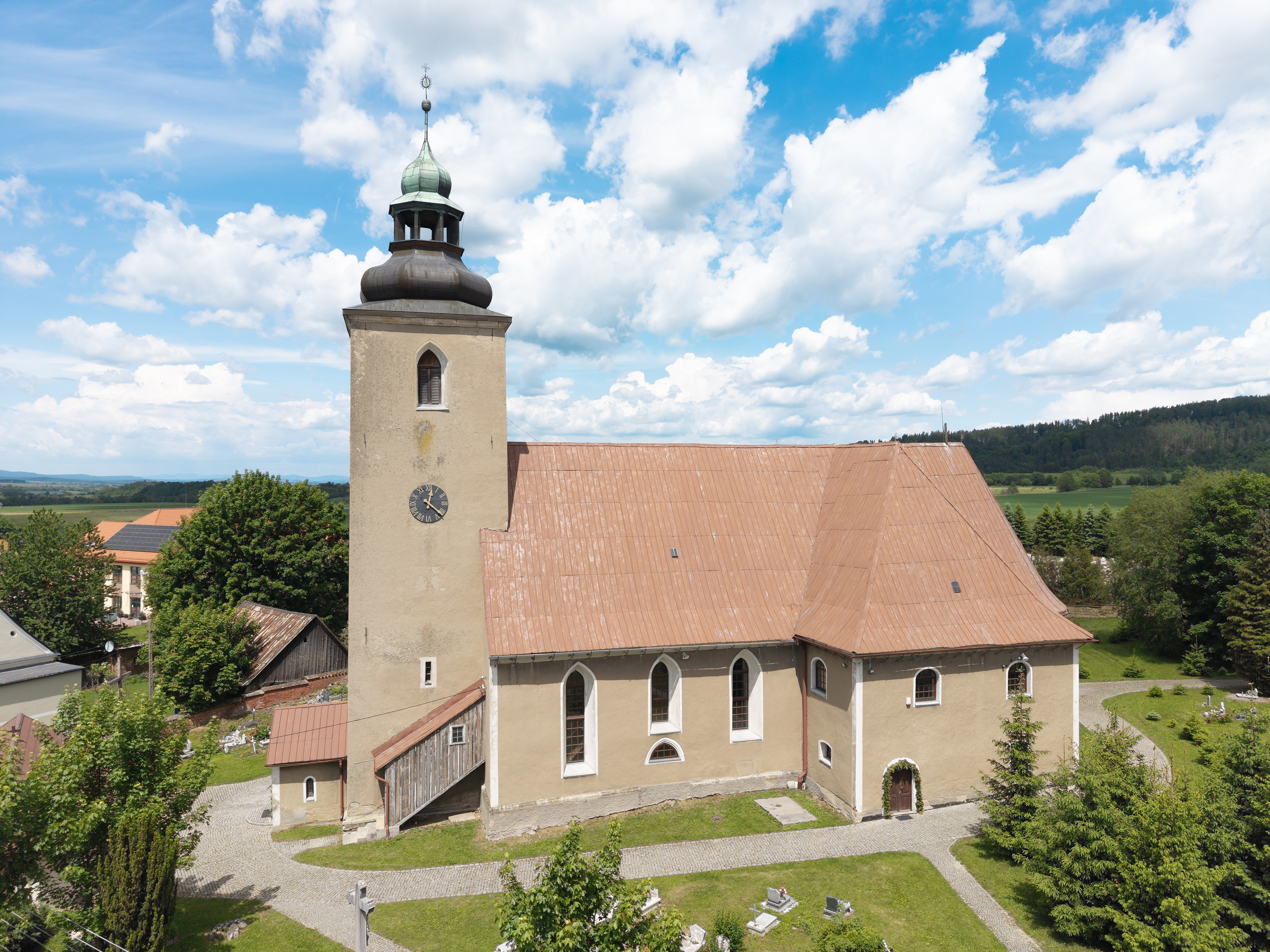
- Church of the Assumption of the Virgin Mary

- Location within Poland
- Coordinates: 50°16′N 16°42′E
- Country: Poland
- Voivodeship: Lower Silesian
- County: Kłodzko
- Gmina: Bystrzyca Kłodzka

Idzików [iˈd͡ʑikuf] (German: Kieslingswalde) is a village in the administrative district of Gmina Bystrzyca Kłodzka, within Kłodzko County, Lower Silesian Voivodeship, in south-western Poland.
