= Ołdrzychowice Kłodzkie =

- Village
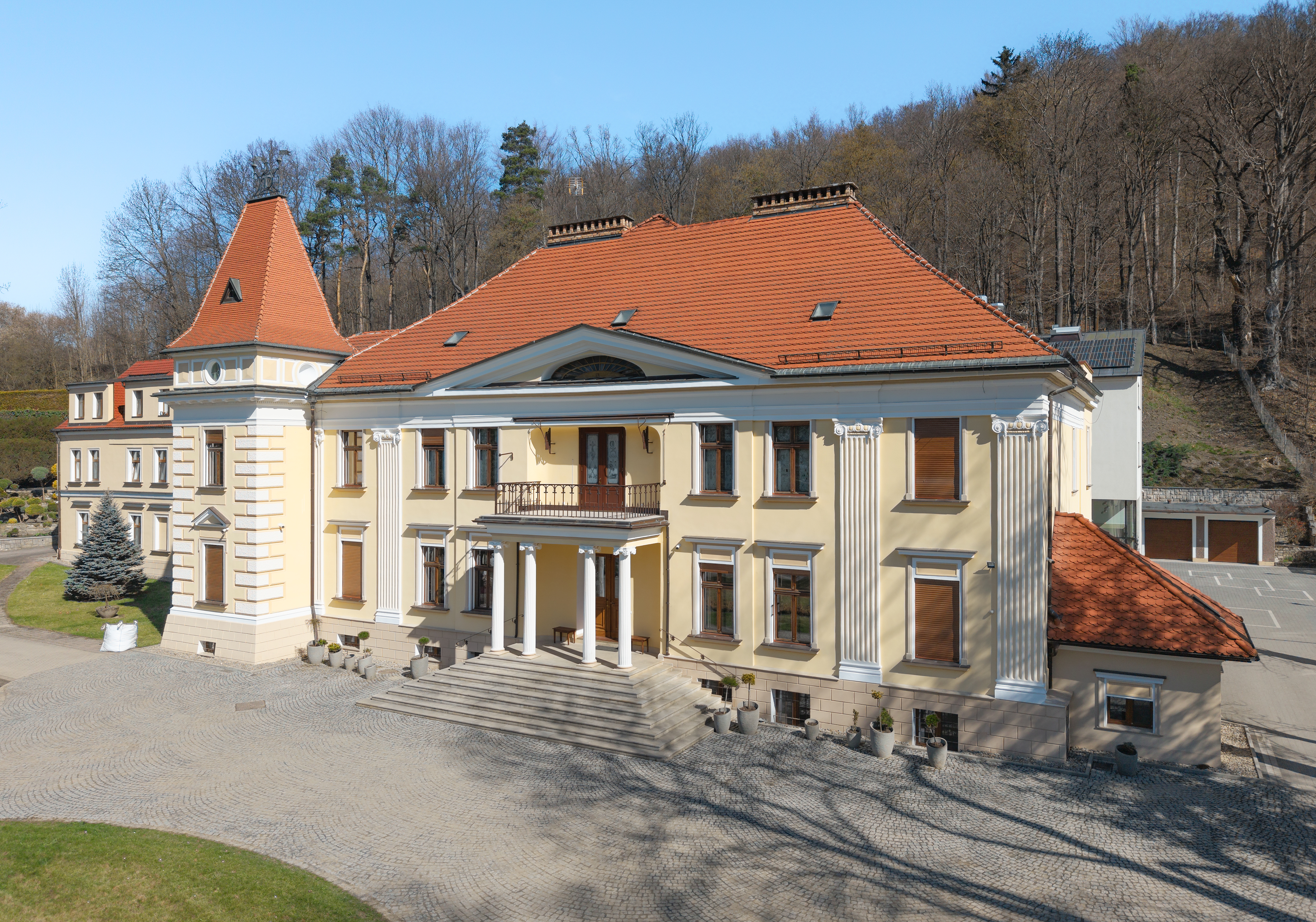
- Oppersdorf family palace

- Location within Poland
- Coordinates: 50°21′N 16°44′E
- Country: Poland
- Voivodeship: Lower Silesian
- County: Kłodzko
- Gmina: Kłodzko

Population (approx.)
  - Total: 2,500

Ołdrzychowice Kłodzkie [ɔu̯dʐɨxɔˈvit͡sɛ ˈkwɔt͡skʲɛ] is a village in the administrative district of Gmina Kłodzko, within Kłodzko County, Lower Silesian Voivodeship, in south-western Poland.
