= Morzyszów =

- Village
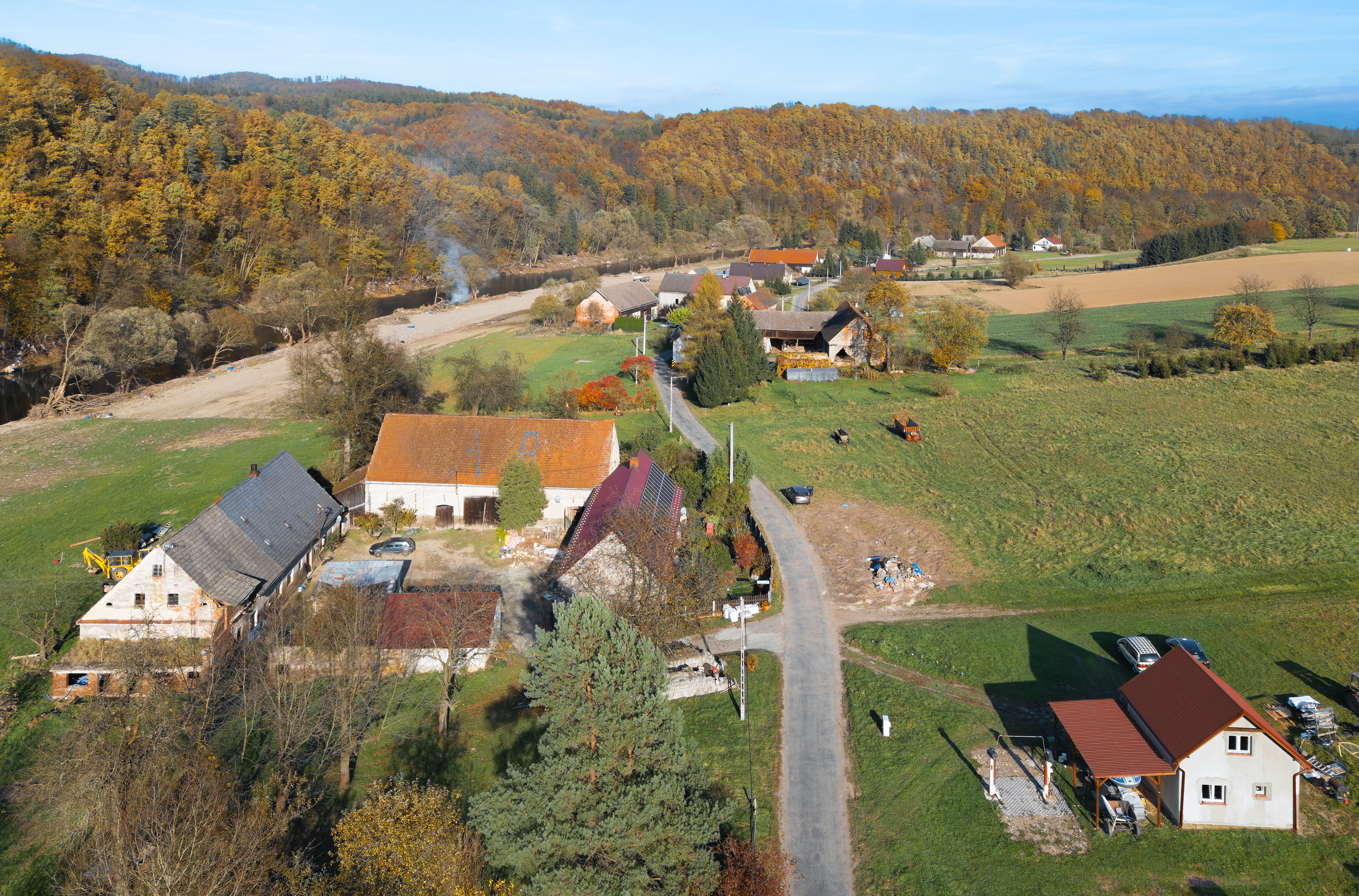
- Morzyszów

- Location within Poland
- Coordinates: 50°30′N 16°42′E
- Country: Poland
- Voivodeship: Lower Silesian
- County: Kłodzko
- Gmina: Kłodzko

Morzyszów [mɔˈʐɨʂuf] is a village in the administrative district of Gmina Kłodzko, within Kłodzko County, Lower Silesian Voivodeship, in south-western Poland.
