= Ludwig, Baron of Terzi =

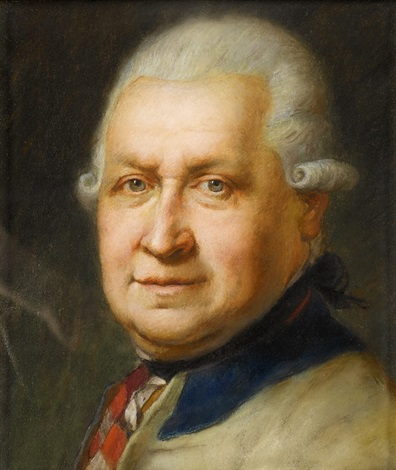

Ludwig, Baron von Terzy (1730–1800) was an Austrian general. He served in the War of Bavarian Succession, with particular distinction in one of its few actions of the war. In January 1779, his commander, Dagobert Sigmund von Wurmser advanced into the County of Glatz in five columns, two of which, commanded by Major General Franz Joseph, Count Kinsky, surrounded Habelschwerdt on 17–18 January. While one column secured the approach, the other, under the leadership of Colonel Pallavicini, (Note: This officer was probably Colonel, later Count, Carlo Pallavicini, of the House of Pallavicini, who had been in Habsburg service since the latter days of the Seven Years War. Erik Lund. War for the every day: generals, knowledge and warfare in early modern Europe. Westport, Ct: Greenwood Press, 1999, ISBN 978-0-313-31041-6, p. 152.) stormed the village and captured the Prince of Hessen-Philippsthal and 700 men, three cannon and seven colors. Wurmser himself led the third column in an assault on the so-called Swedish blockhouse at Oberschwedeldorf. It and the village of Habelschwerdt were set on fire by howitzers. Terzy, then a major general commanding the remaining two columns, threw back the enemy support and took 300 Prussian prisoners.

During the War of the First Coalition under Prince Josias of Saxe-Coburg-Saalfeld, Terzy was employed in the campaign in 1793 as Feldmarschallieutenant. He commanded Coburg's left wing on the Sambre. In January 1797 he was General of Artillery, and in April, the Emperor appointed him commander of the Austrian troops front; in June he left a part of his troops, under the command of the Johann von Klenau, engage in the Venetian Istria.

He died in Vienna on 20 February 1800, in his 70th year.

Military offices
Preceded by Graf von Königsegg-Rothenfels	Proprietor (Inhaber) of Infantry Regiment Nr. 16; 1778–1799	Succeeded by Archduke Rudolf of Austria

== Notes and citations ==
=== References ===
- Knötel, Richard; Knötel, Herbert; Sieg, Herbert (1980). Uniforms of the World: A Compendium of Army, Navy, and Air Force Uniforms 1700-1937. New York, N.Y.: Charles Scribner's Sons. ISBN 0-684-16304-7.
- Millar, Stephen (2005). "Austrian Infantry Regiments and Their Commanders 1792-1815: Line Infantry Regiments Nrs. 11 - 20". The Napoleon Series.
