= Mikowice =

Mikowice may refer to the following places in Poland:

- Mikowice, Lower Silesian Voivodeship (south-west Poland)
- Mikowice, Opole Voivodeship (south-west Poland)
