= Gołogłowy =

- Village
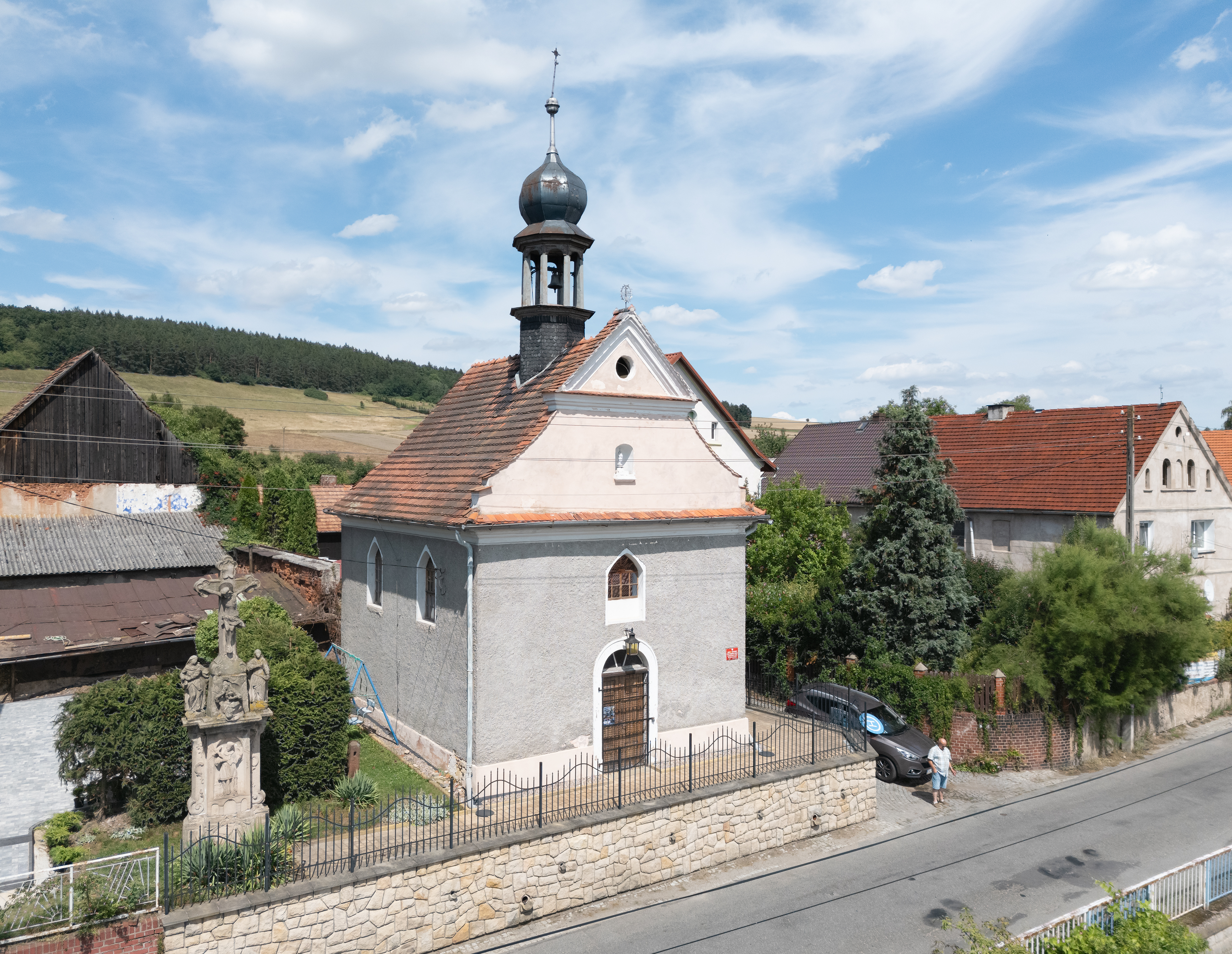

- Location within Poland
- Coordinates: 50°28′06″N 16°37′21″E
- Country: Poland
- Voivodeship: Lower Silesian
- County: Kłodzko
- Gmina: Kłodzko
- Time zone: UTC+1 (CET)
  - Summer (DST): UTC+2 (CEST)
- Vehicle registration: DKL

Gołogłowy [ɡɔwɔˈɡwɔvɨ] is a village in the administrative district of Gmina Kłodzko, within Kłodzko County, Lower Silesian Voivodeship, in south-western Poland.
