= Starków, Lower Silesian Voivodeship =

Starków
- Village
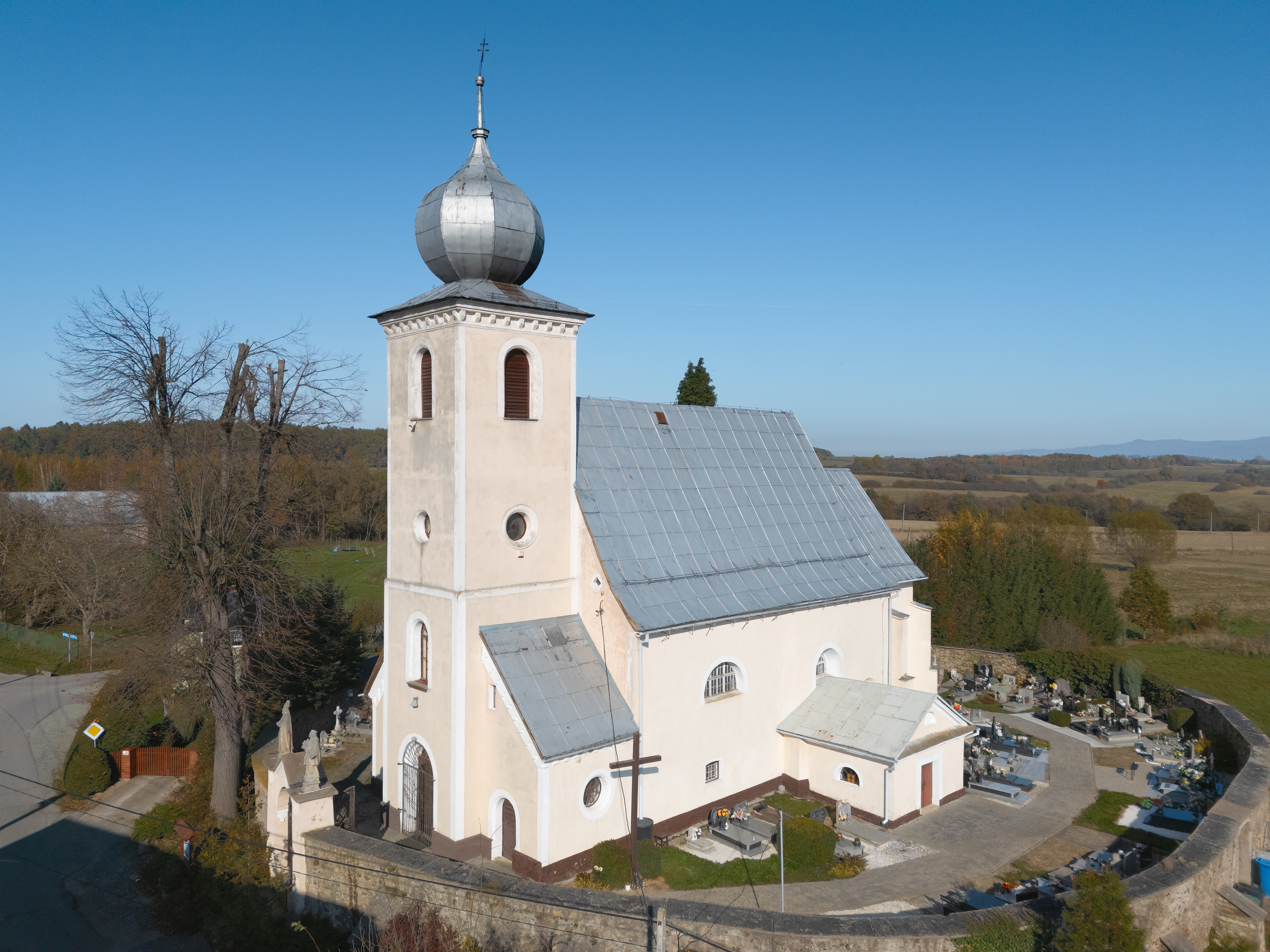
- Church of Saint Nicholas

- Location within Poland
- Coordinates: 50°22′17″N 16°34′34″E
- Country: Poland
- Voivodeship: Lower Silesian
- County: Kłodzko
- Gmina: Kłodzko

Starków [ˈstarkuf] is a village in the administrative district of Gmina Kłodzko, within Kłodzko County, Lower Silesian Voivodeship, in south-western Poland.

The suffix -dorf of the former German name Alt Batzdorf is typical for settlements founded by Germans during Medieval Ostsiedlung.
