= Podzamek =

- Village
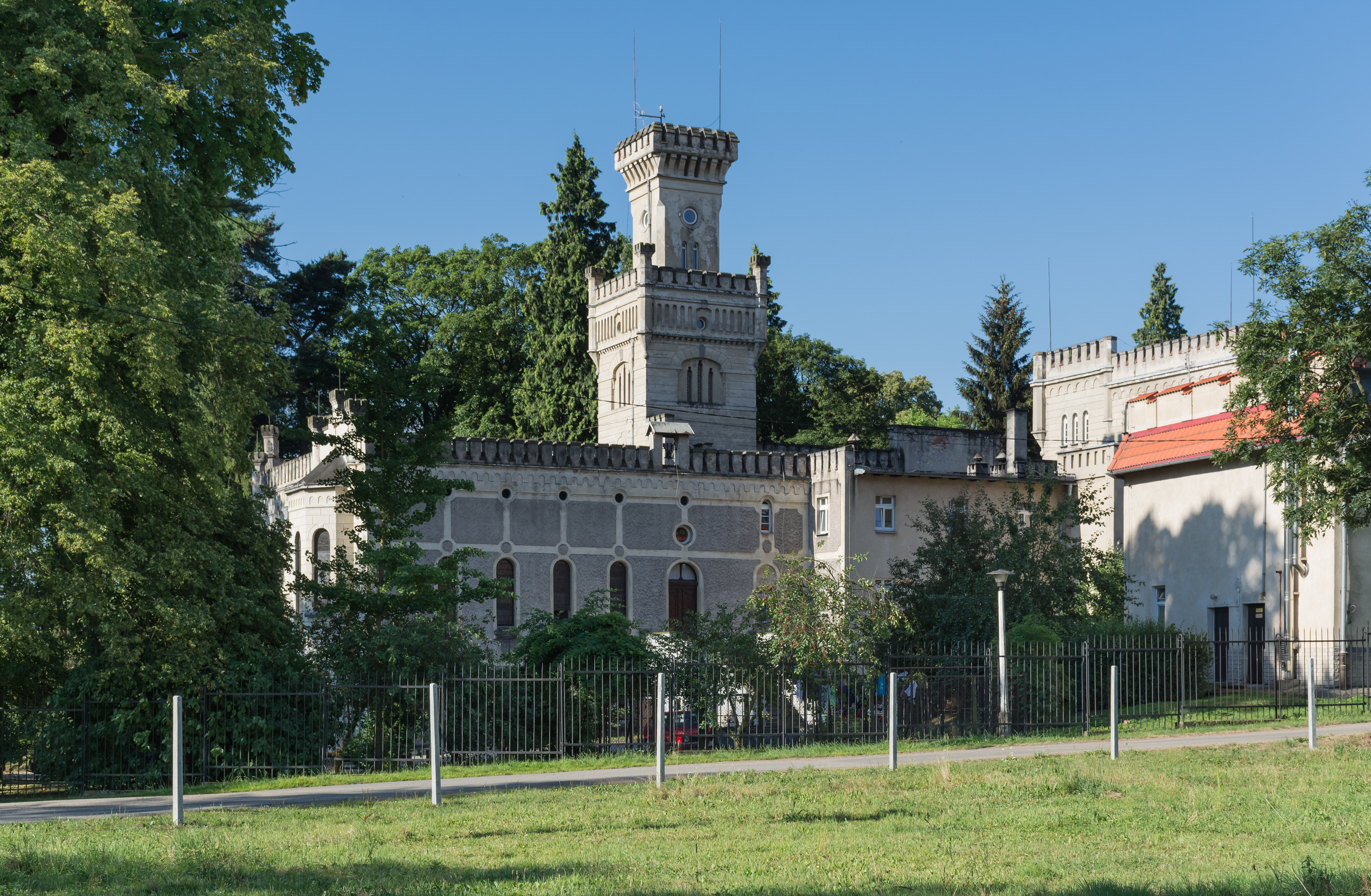
- Palace in Podzamek

- Location within Poland
- Coordinates: 50°26′N 16°45′E
- Country: Poland
- Voivodeship: Lower Silesian
- County: Kłodzko
- Gmina: Kłodzko

Podzamek [pɔˈd͡zamɛk] is a village in the administrative district of Gmina Kłodzko, within Kłodzko County, Lower Silesian Voivodeship, in south-western Poland.
