= Święcko =

- Village
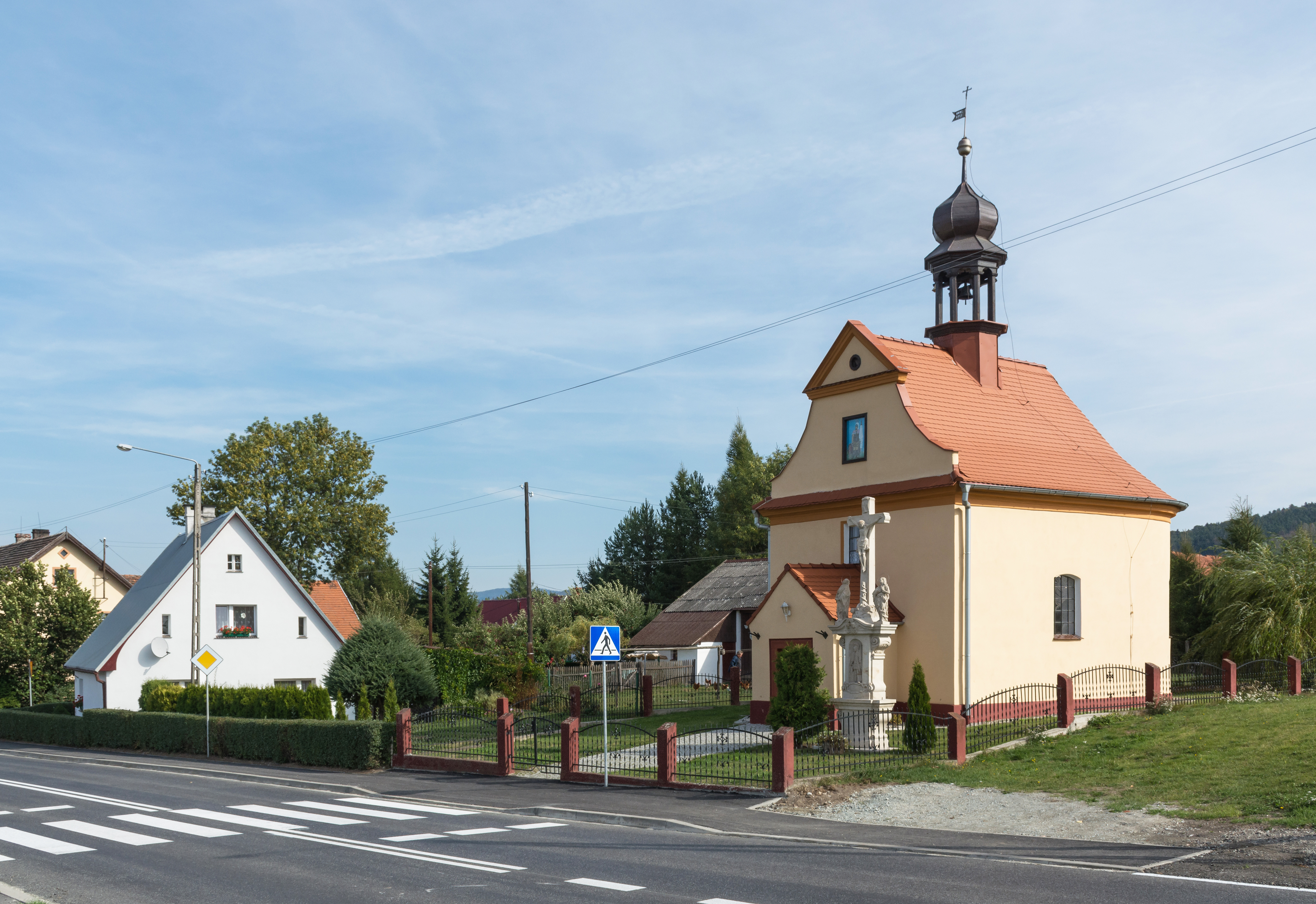
- Saint Florian church in Święcko

- Location within Poland
- Coordinates: 50°29′50″N 16°35′10″E
- Country: Poland
- Voivodeship: Lower Silesian
- County: Kłodzko
- Gmina: Kłodzko

Population
  - Total: 253
- Time zone: UTC+1 (CET)
  - Summer (DST): UTC+2 (CEST)
- Vehicle registration: DKL

Święcko (German: Schwenz, Polish pronunciation: [ˈɕfjɛnt͡skɔ]) is a village in the administrative district of Gmina Kłodzko, within Kłodzko County, Lower Silesian Voivodeship, in south-western Poland.

== History ==
In the Middle Ages the area was at various times under Bohemian and Polish rule, and later on it also fell to Prussia and Germany. In 1945, following Germany's defeat in World War II, the region became again part of Poland.

== Transport ==
Voivodeship road 381 (road of regional importance) runs through the village, and its intersection with Voivodeship road 386 is located just south of the village.
