= Jaszkowa Górna =

- Village
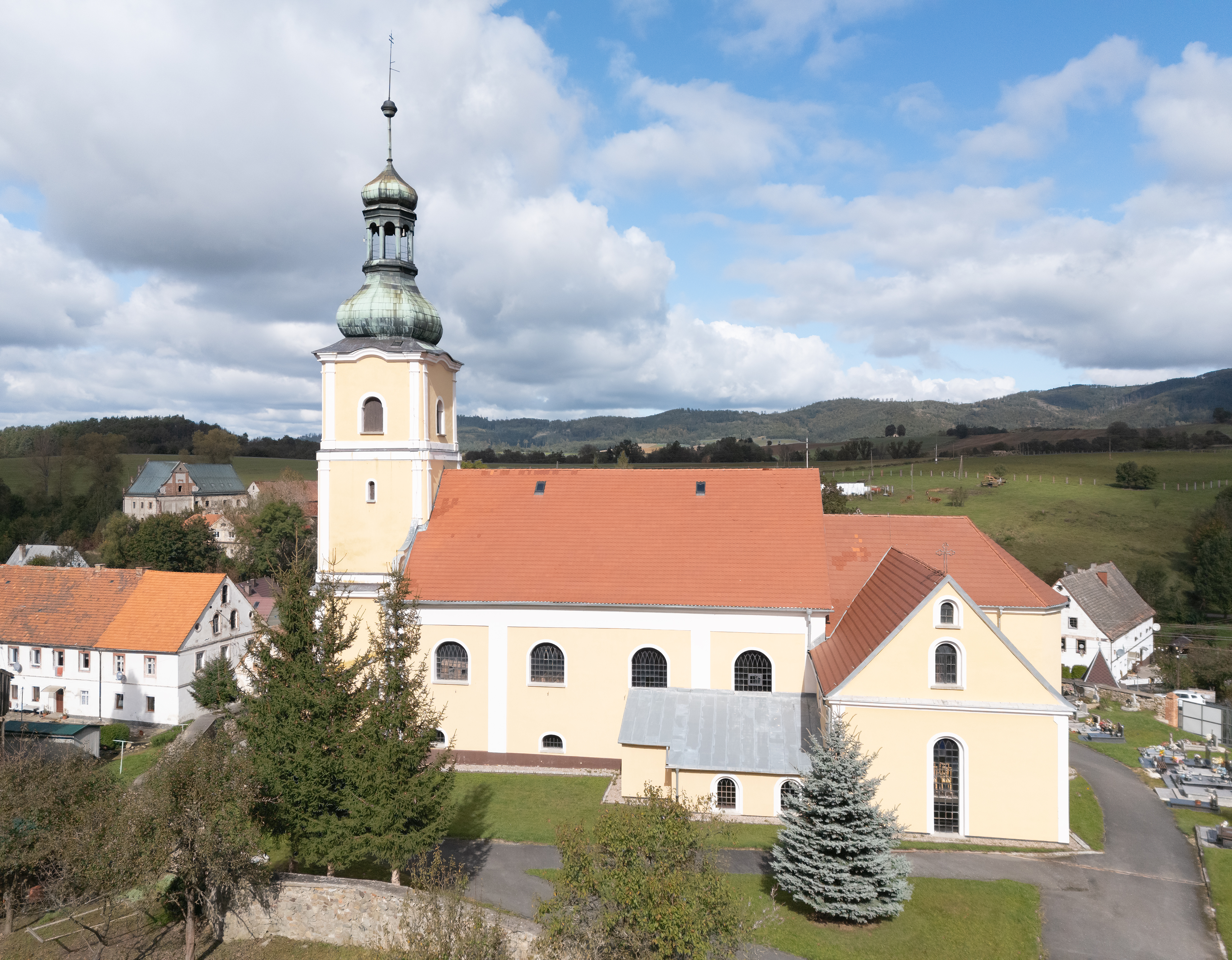

- Location within Poland
- Coordinates: 50°24′08″N 16°45′04″E
- Country: Poland
- Voivodeship: Lower Silesian
- County: Kłodzko
- Gmina: Kłodzko

Jaszkowa Górna [jaʂˈkɔva ˈɡurna] is a village in the administrative district of Gmina Kłodzko, within Kłodzko County, Lower Silesian Voivodeship, in south-western Poland.
