= Bierkowice =

Bierkowice may refer to the following places in Poland:

- Bierkowice, Lower Silesian Voivodeship, in Gmina Kłodzko, Kłodzko County, Lower Silesian Voivodeship, SW Poland
- Other places called Bierkowice (listed in Polish Wikipedia)
