= Piszkowice =

- Village
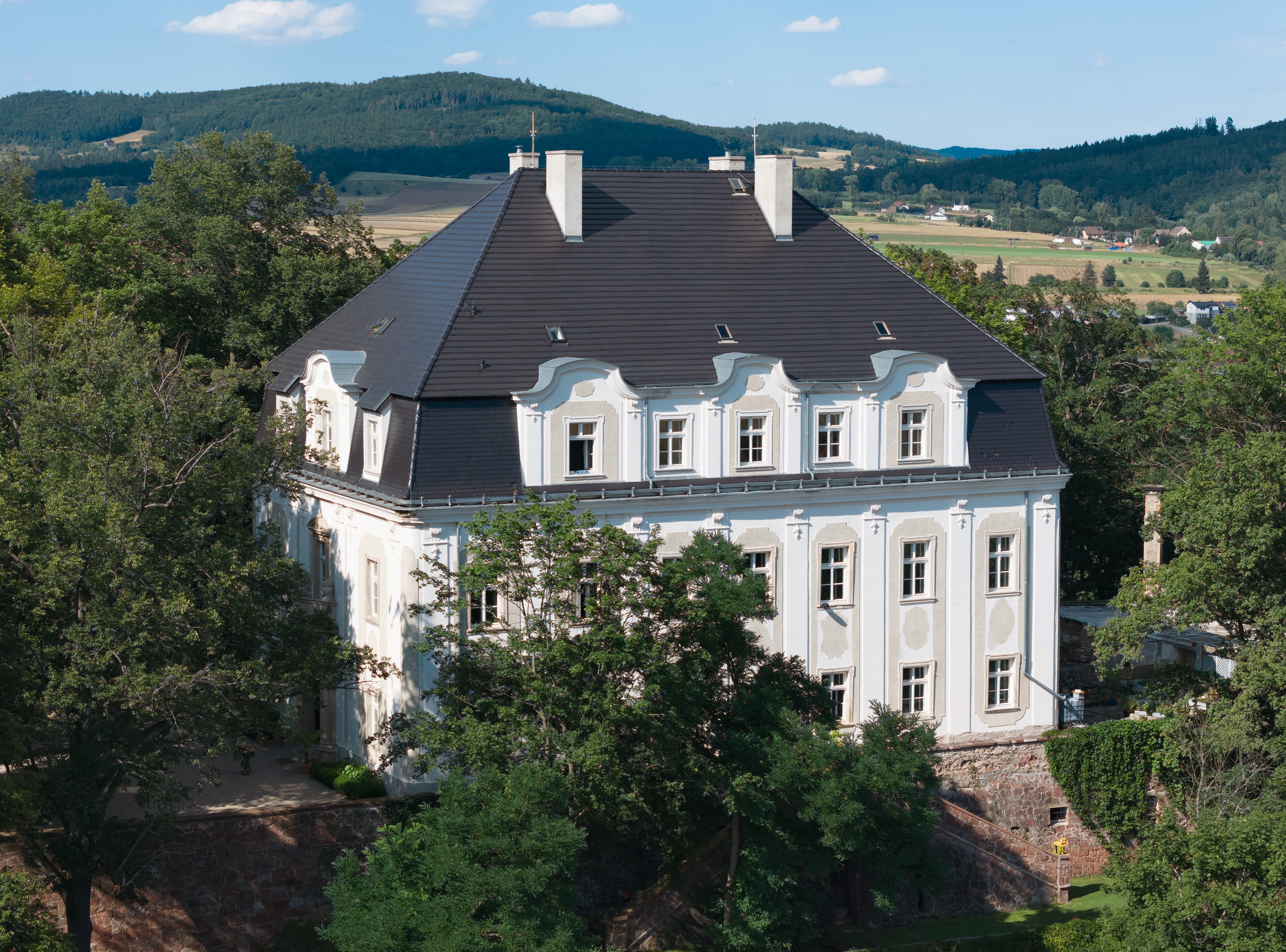
- Palace in Piszkowice

- Location within Poland
- Coordinates: 50°28′8″N 16°35′22″E
- Country: Poland
- Voivodeship: Lower Silesian
- County: Kłodzko
- Gmina: Kłodzko

Piszkowice [piʂkɔˈvit͡sɛ] is a village in the administrative district of Gmina Kłodzko, within Kłodzko County, Lower Silesian Voivodeship, in south-western Poland.
