= Ścinawica =

- Village
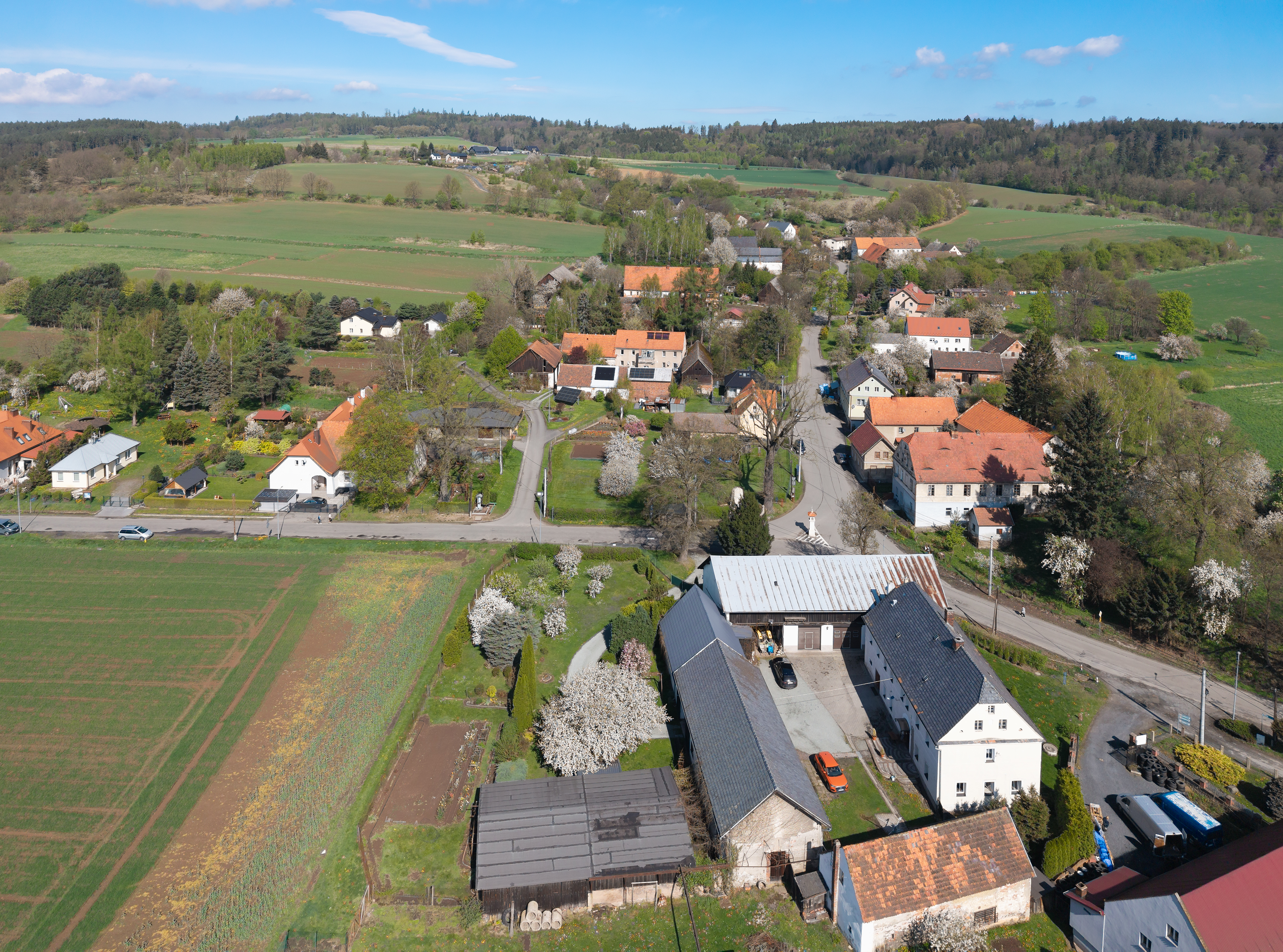
- Aerial view of Ścinawica

- Location within Poland
- Coordinates: 50°29′N 16°38′E
- Country: Poland
- Voivodeship: Lower Silesian
- County: Kłodzko
- Gmina: Kłodzko
- Time zone: UTC+1 (CET)
  - Summer (DST): UTC+2 (CEST)
- Vehicle registration: DKL

Ścinawica [ɕt͡ɕinaˈvit͡sa] is a village in the administrative district of Gmina Kłodzko, within Kłodzko County, Lower Silesian Voivodeship, in south-western Poland.
