= Droszków =

Droszków may refer to the following places in Poland:

- Droszków, Lower Silesian Voivodeship (south-west Poland)
- Droszków, Lubusz Voivodeship (west Poland)
