= Ruszowice =

Ruszowice may refer to the following places in Poland:

- Ruszowice, Głogów County in Gmina Głogów, Głogów County in Lower Silesian Voivodeship (SW Poland)
- Ruszowice, Kłodzko County in Gmina Kłodzko, Kłodzko County in Lower Silesian Voivodeship (SW Poland)
