= Gorzuchów =

- Village
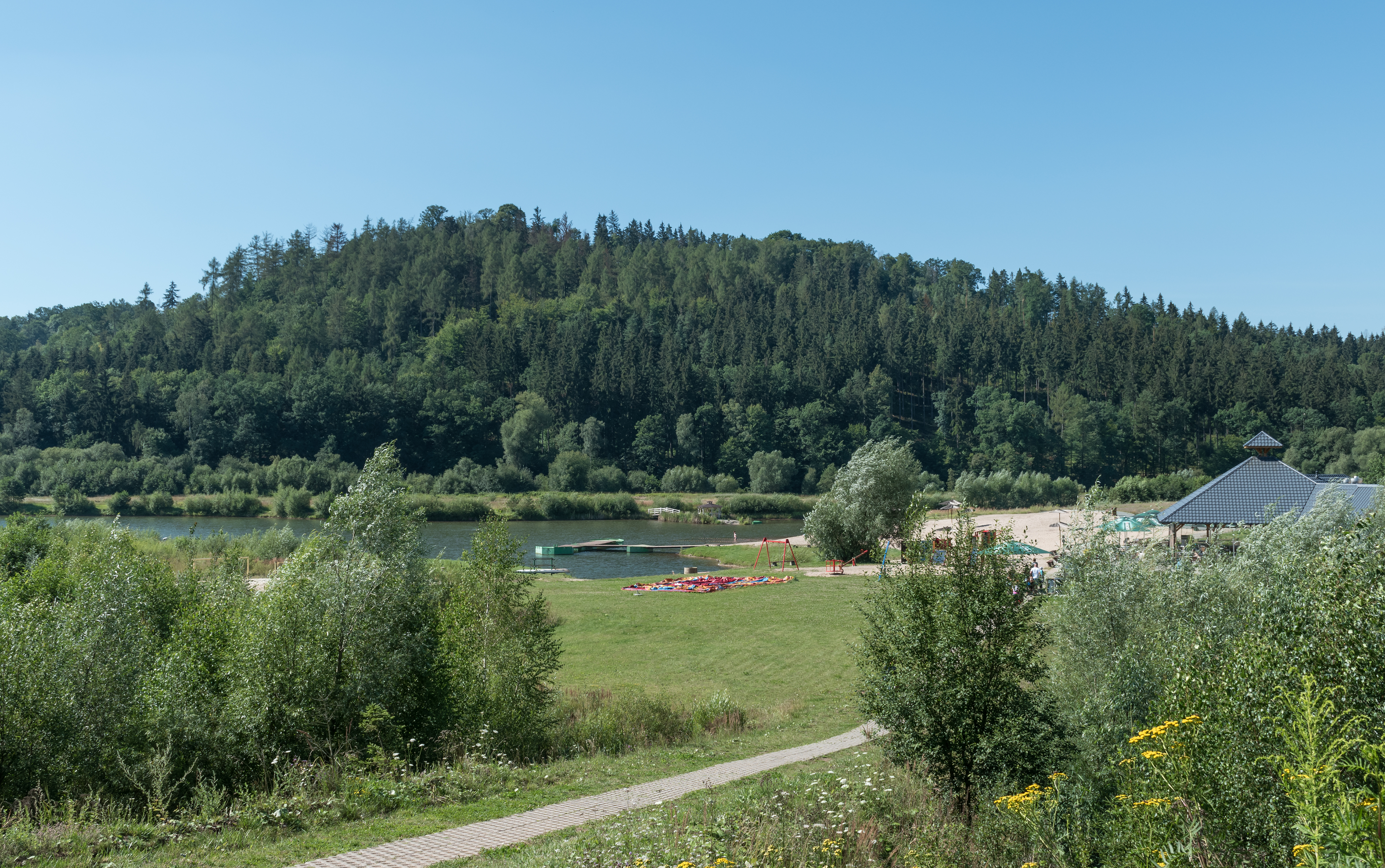

- Location within Poland
- Coordinates: 50°29′25″N 16°34′38″E
- Country: Poland
- Voivodeship: Lower Silesian
- County: Kłodzko
- Gmina: Kłodzko

Gorzuchów [ɡɔˈʐuxuf] is a village in the administrative district of Gmina Kłodzko, within Kłodzko County, Lower Silesian Voivodeship, in south-western Poland.

== See also ==
- Gorzuchów Kłodzki station, a railway stop in Gorzuchów
