= Wojciechowice, Lower Silesian Voivodeship =

Wojciechowice
- Village
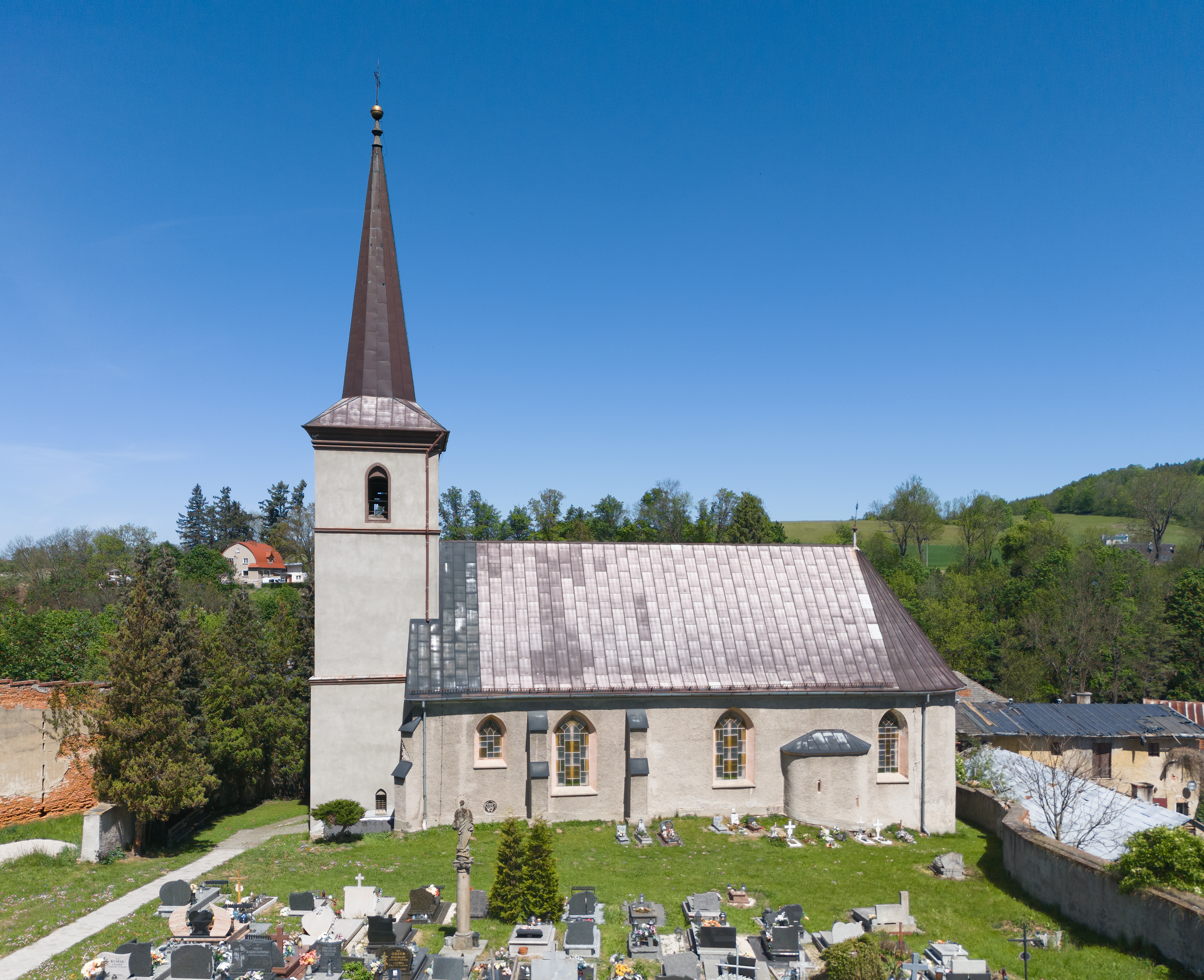
- Church of Saint Michael Archangel

- Location within Poland
- Coordinates: 50°27′10″N 16°42′40″E
- Country: Poland
- Voivodeship: Lower Silesian
- County: Kłodzko
- Gmina: Kłodzko

Wojciechowice (Polish: [vɔjt͡ɕɛxɔˈvit͡sɛ]) is a village in the administrative district of Gmina Kłodzko, within Kłodzko County, Lower Silesian Voivodeship, in south-western Poland.
