= Rogówek =

Rogówek may refer to the following places in Poland:

- Rogówek, Kłodzko County in Lower Silesian Voivodeship (south-west Poland)
- Rogówek, Wołów County in Lower Silesian Voivodeship (south-west Poland)
- Rogówek, Podlaskie Voivodeship (north-east Poland)
- Rogówek, Świętokrzyskie Voivodeship (south-central Poland)
- Rogówek, Masovian Voivodeship (east-central Poland)
