= Marcinów, Lower Silesian Voivodeship =

Marcinów
- Village
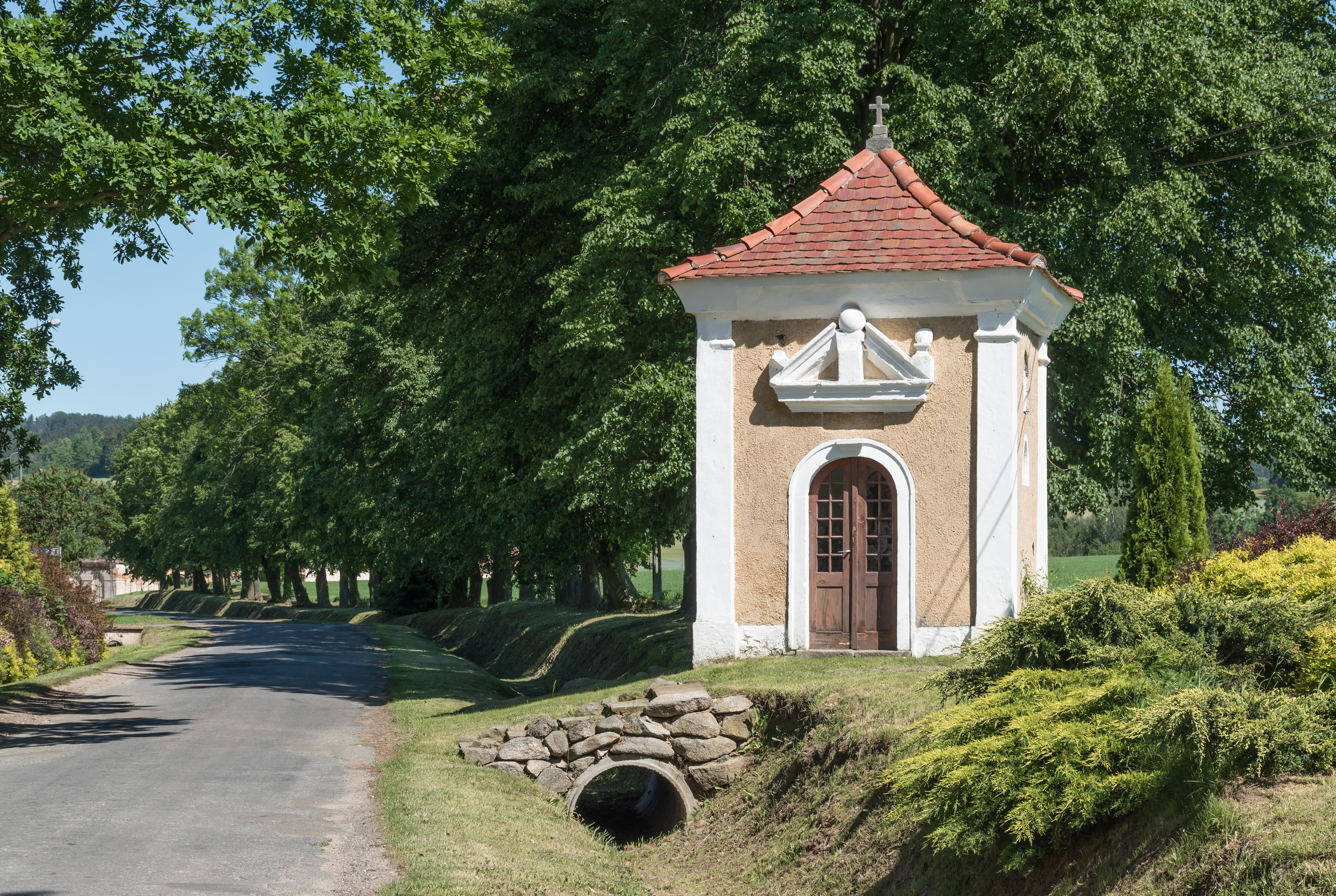
- Chapel in the village

- Location within Poland
- Coordinates: 50°23′13″N 16°41′23″E
- Country: Poland
- Voivodeship: Lower Silesian
- County: Kłodzko
- Gmina: Kłodzko

Population
  - Total: 126

Marcinów [marˈt͡ɕinuf] is a village in the administrative district of Gmina Kłodzko, within Kłodzko County, Lower Silesian Voivodeship, in south-western Poland.
