= Ławica, Lower Silesian Voivodeship =

Ławica
- Village
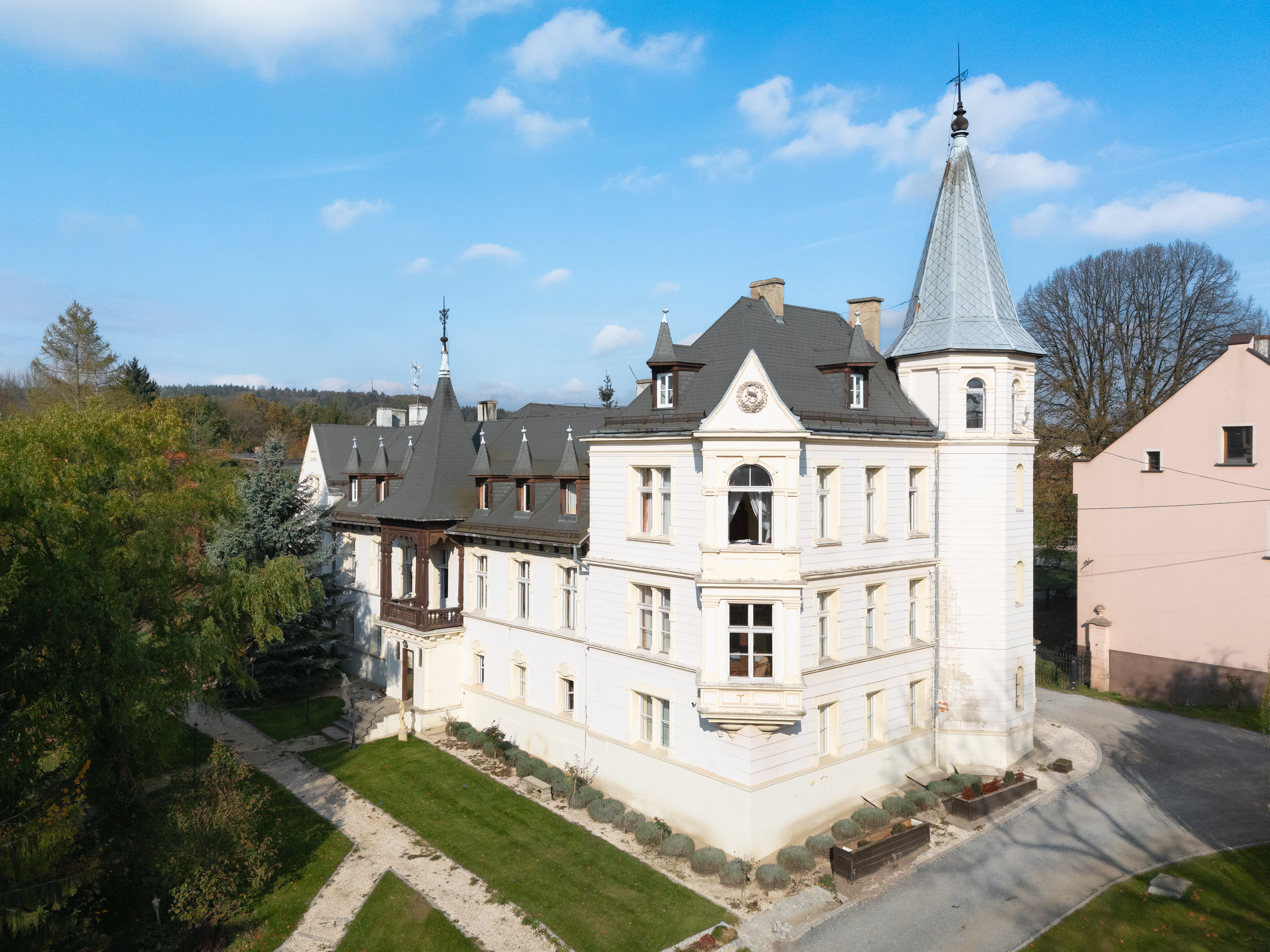

- Location within Poland
- Coordinates: 50°29′4″N 16°39′43″E
- Country: Poland
- Voivodeship: Lower Silesian
- County: Kłodzko
- Gmina: Kłodzko
- Time zone: UTC+1 (CET)
  - Summer (DST): UTC+2 (CEST)
- Vehicle registration: DKL

Ławica [waˈvit͡sa] is a village in the administrative district of Gmina Kłodzko, within Kłodzko County, Lower Silesian Voivodeship, in south-western Poland.
