= Kamieniec, Lower Silesian Voivodeship =

Kamieniec
- Village
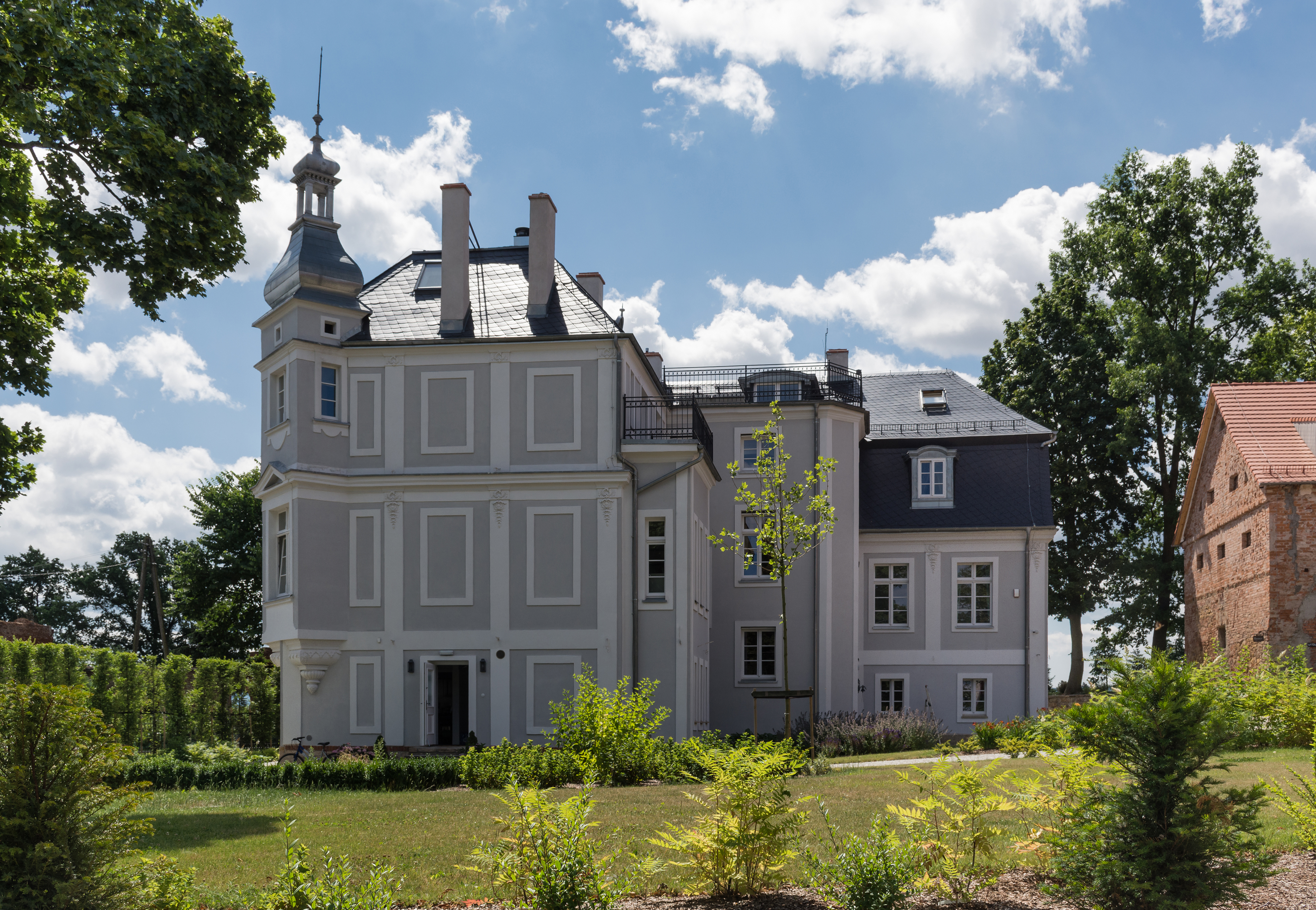
- Renovated palace in Kamieniec

- Location within Poland
- Coordinates: 50°27′26″N 16°32′55″E
- Country: Poland
- Voivodeship: Lower Silesian
- County: Kłodzko
- Gmina: Kłodzko
- Time zone: UTC+1 (CET)
  - Summer (DST): UTC+2 (CEST)
- Vehicle registration: DKL

Kamieniec [kaˈmjɛɲɛt͡s] is a village in the administrative district of Gmina Kłodzko, within Kłodzko County, Lower Silesian Voivodeship, in south-western Poland.

The village was mentioned under its Latinized Old Polish name Camenicza in a document of 1286, when it part of the Duchy of Wrocław within fragmented Piast-ruled Poland. The name is of Polish origin and is derived from the word kamień, which means "stone".
