= Wojbórz =

- Village
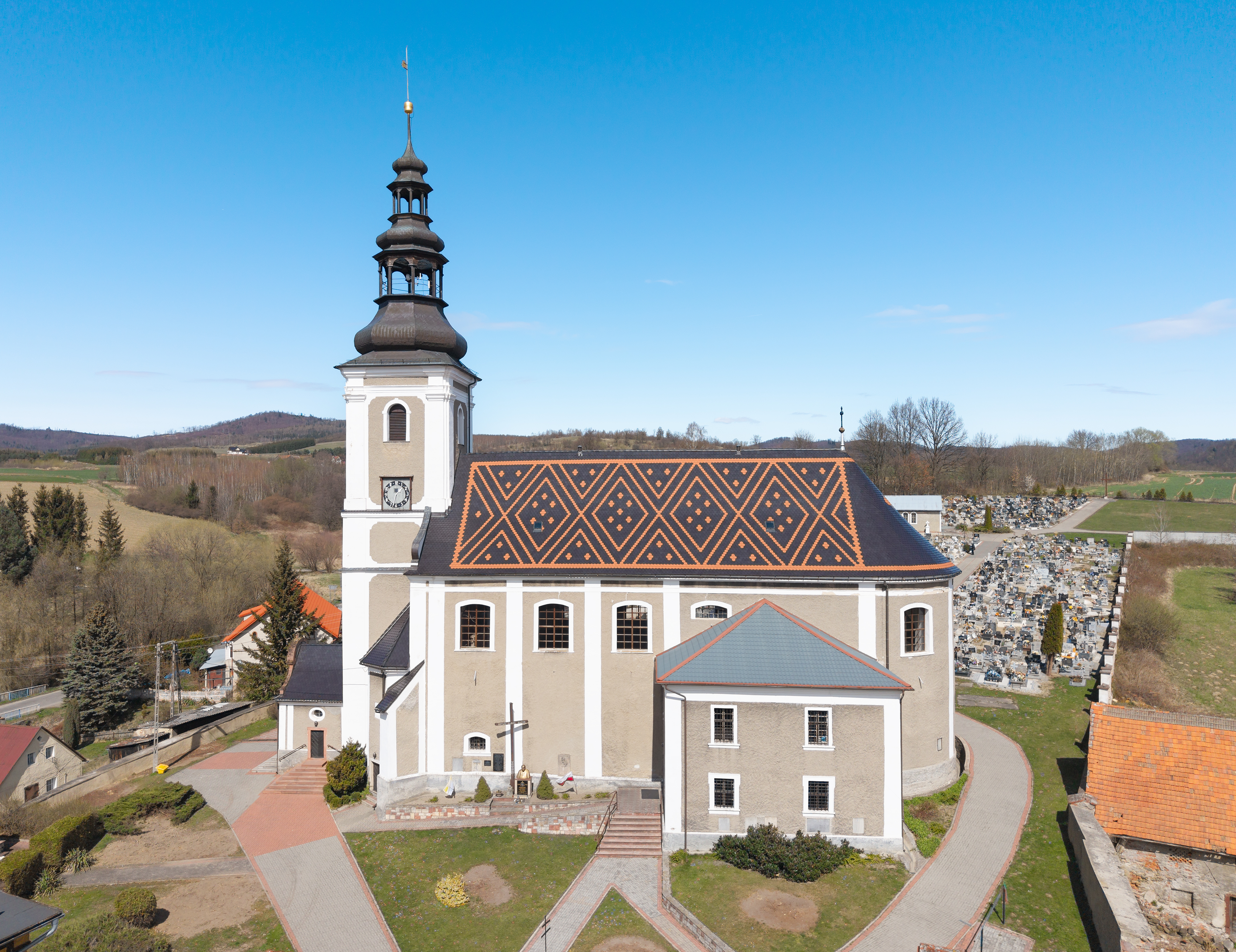

- Location within Poland
- Coordinates: 50°30′30″N 16°39′0″E
- Country: Poland
- Voivodeship: Lower Silesian
- County: Kłodzko
- Gmina: Kłodzko

Wojbórz [ˈvɔi̯buʂ] is a village in the administrative district of Gmina Kłodzko, within Kłodzko County, Lower Silesian Voivodeship, in south-western Poland.
