= Korytów, Kłodzko County =

Korytów
- Village
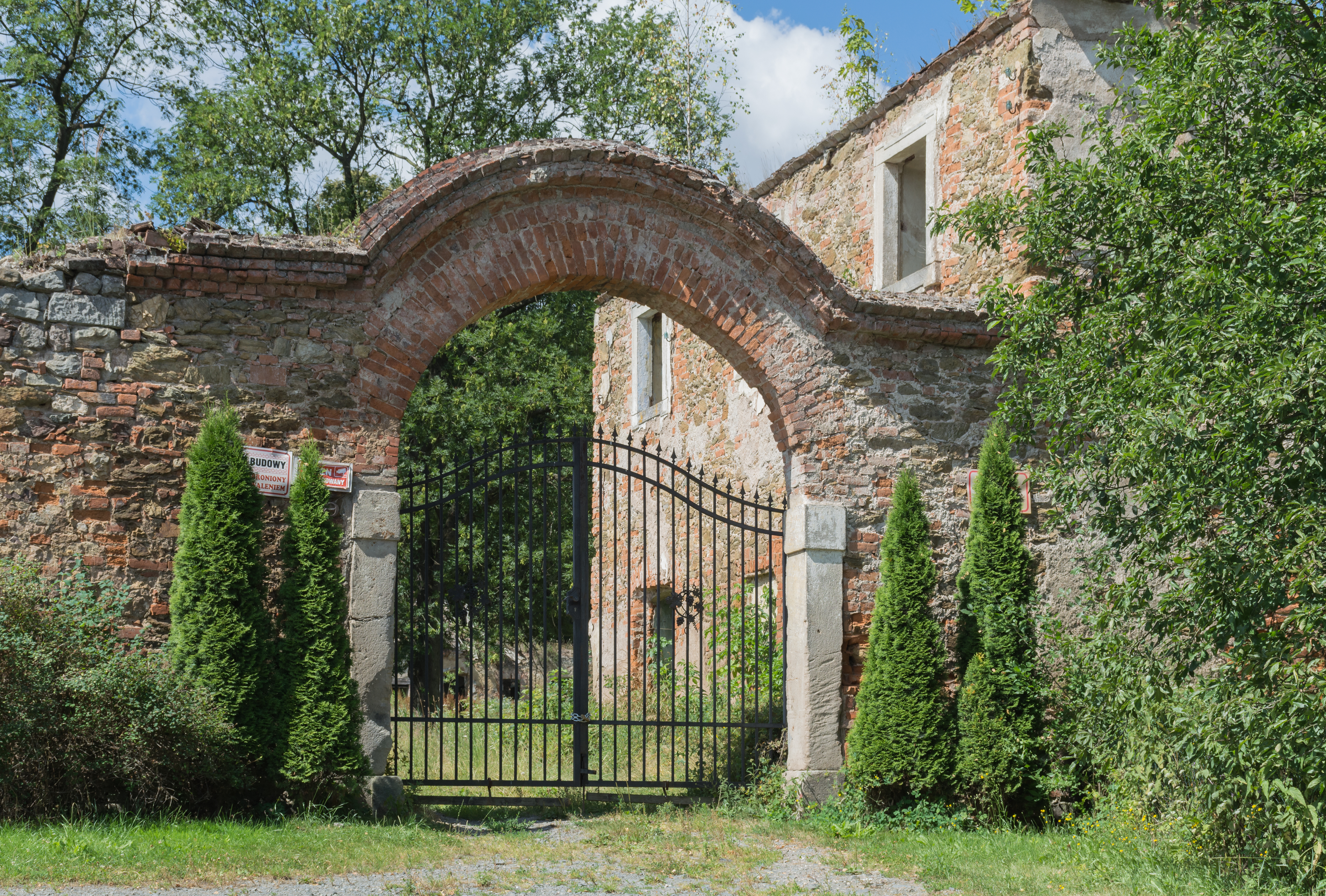
- Ruins of the Korytów Palace

- Location within Poland
- Coordinates: 50°27′20″N 16°36′10″E
- Country: Poland
- Voivodeship: Lower Silesian
- County: Kłodzko
- Gmina: Kłodzko

Korytów [kɔˈrɨtuf] is a village in the administrative district of Gmina Kłodzko, within Kłodzko County, Lower Silesian Voivodeship, in south-western Poland.
