= Romanowo, Lower Silesian Voivodeship =

Romanowo
- Village
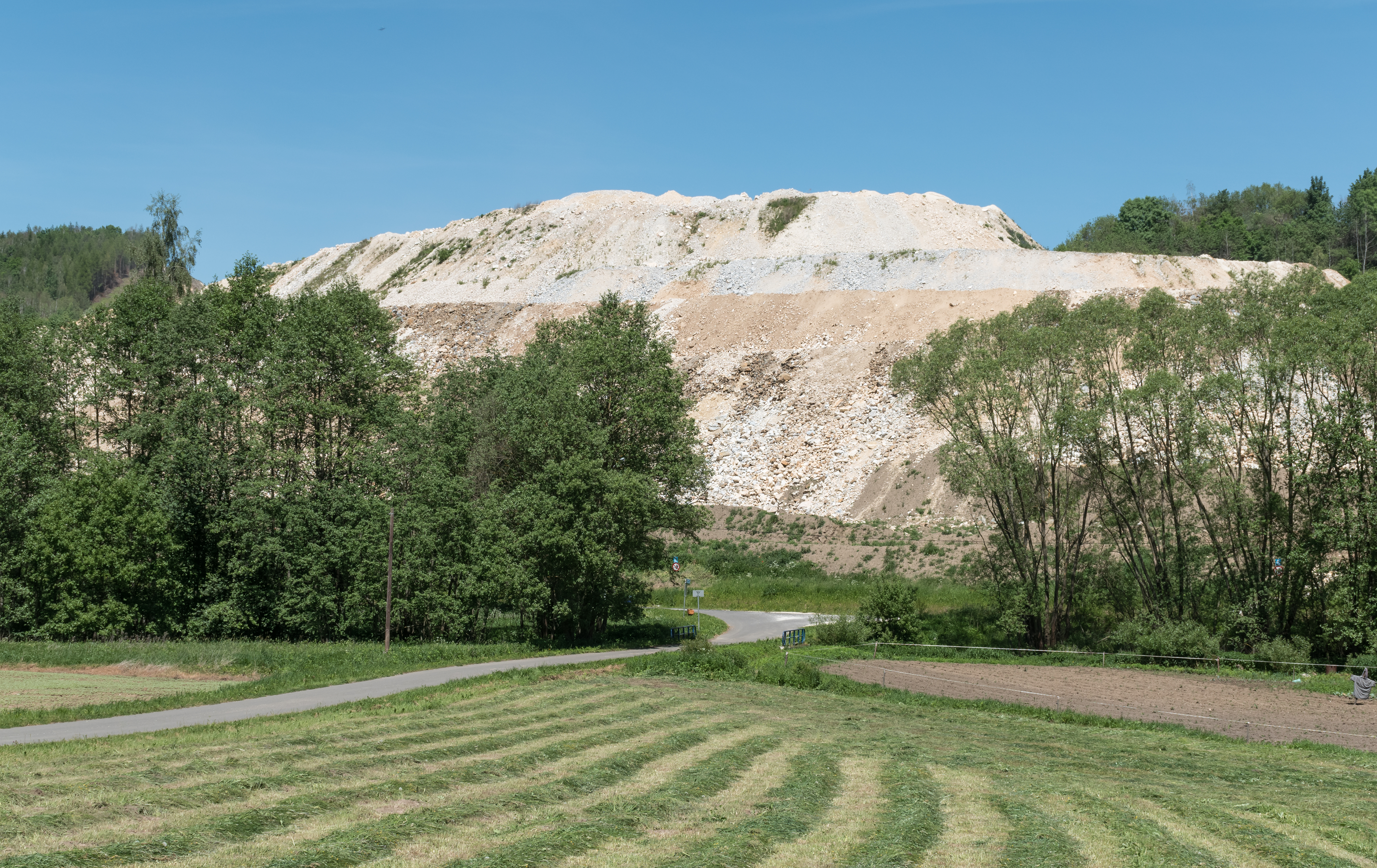
- Quarry

- Location within Poland
- Coordinates: 50°20′53″N 16°42′12″E
- Country: Poland
- Voivodeship: Lower Silesian
- County: Kłodzko
- Gmina: Kłodzko
- Highest elevation: 700 m (2,300 ft)

Romanowo [rɔmaˈnɔvɔ] is a village in the administrative district of Gmina Kłodzko, within Kłodzko County, Lower Silesian Voivodeship, in south-western Poland.
