= Roszyce =

- Village
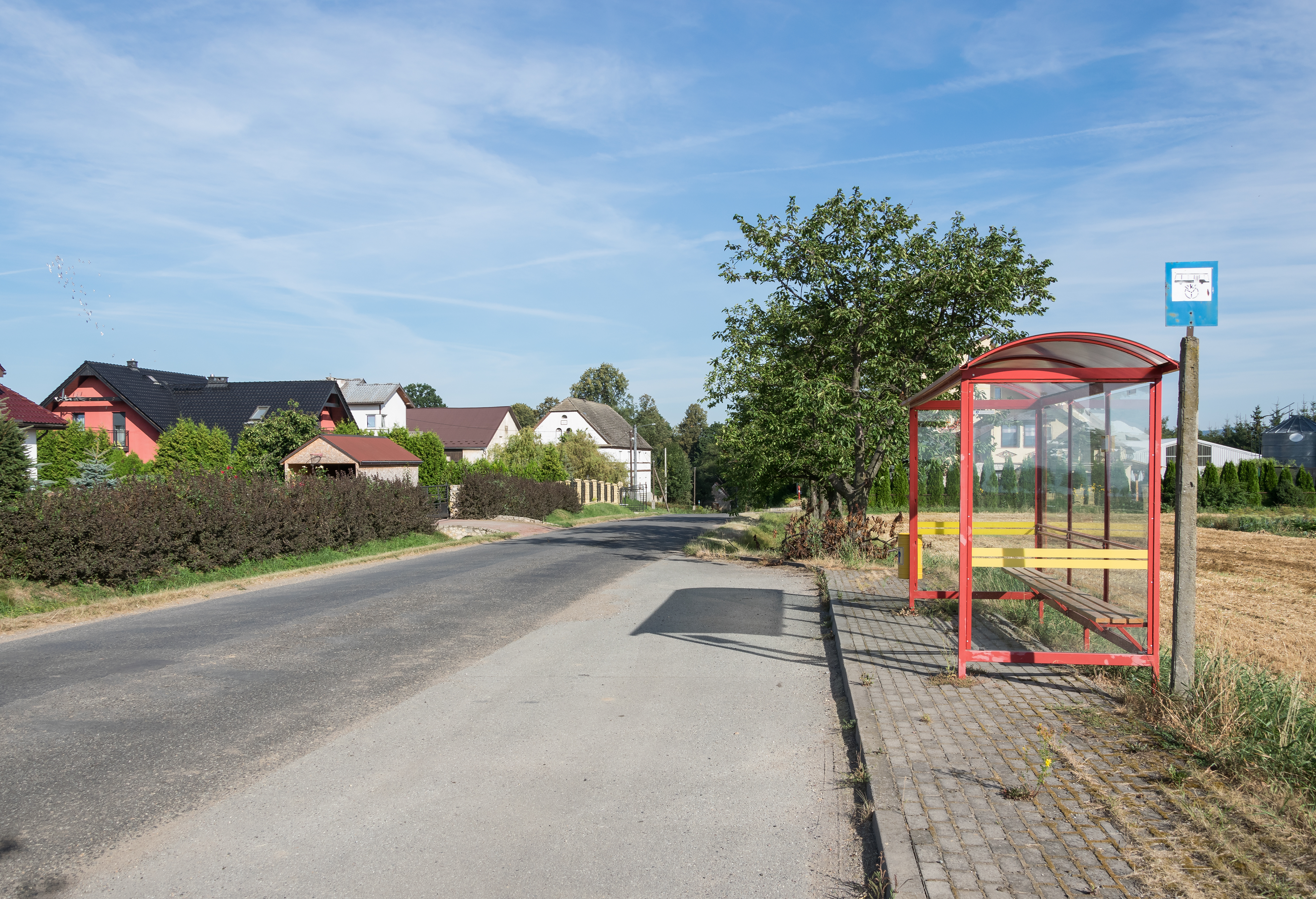

- Location within Poland
- Coordinates: 50°27′N 16°36′E
- Country: Poland
- Voivodeship: Lower Silesian
- County: Kłodzko
- Gmina: Kłodzko

Population
  - Total: 167

Roszyce [rɔˈʂɨt͡sɛ] is a village in the administrative district of Gmina Kłodzko, within Kłodzko County, Lower Silesian Voivodeship, in south-western Poland.
