= Młynów =

Młynów may refer to the following places in Poland:

- Młynów, Lower Silesian Voivodeship (south-west Poland)
- Młynów, Łódź Voivodeship (central Poland)
- Młynów, Wołyń Voivodeship (1921–1939) (eastern Poland, today Mlyniv in Ukraine)
- Młynów, Greater Poland Voivodeship (west-central Poland)
- Młynów, Warsaw, a neighbourhood in the borough of Wola
