= Wilcza, Lower Silesian Voivodeship =

Wilcza
- Village
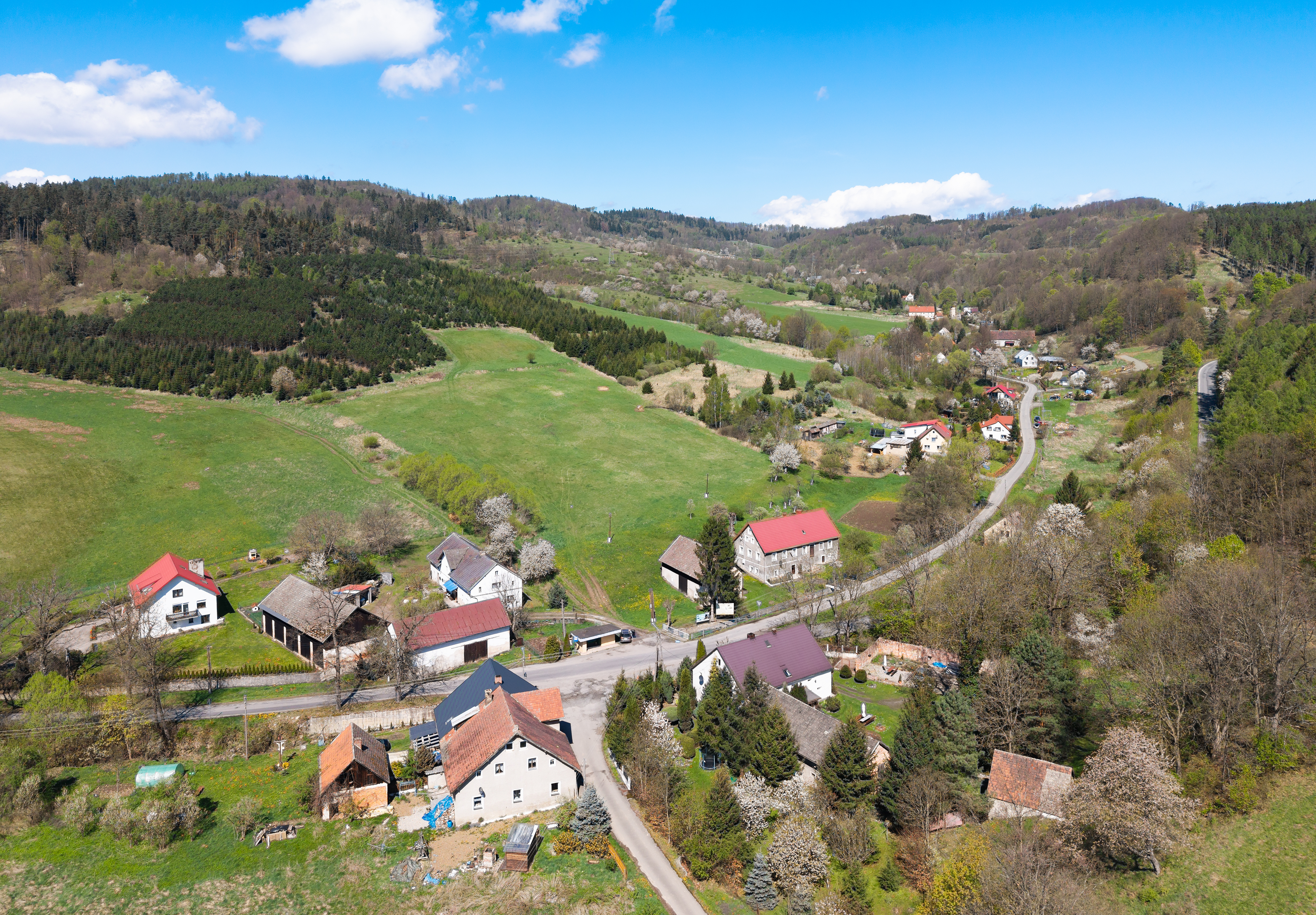

- Location within Poland
- Coordinates: 50°32′5″N 16°39′45″E
- Country: Poland
- Voivodeship: Lower Silesian
- County: Kłodzko
- Gmina: Kłodzko
- Highest elevation: 500 m (1,600 ft)
- Lowest elevation: 460 m (1,510 ft)

Population
  - Total: 120

Wilcza [ˈvilt͡ʂa] is a village in the administrative district of Gmina Kłodzko, within Kłodzko County, Lower Silesian Voivodeship, in south-western Poland.
