= Boguszyn, Lower Silesian Voivodeship =

Boguszyn
- Village
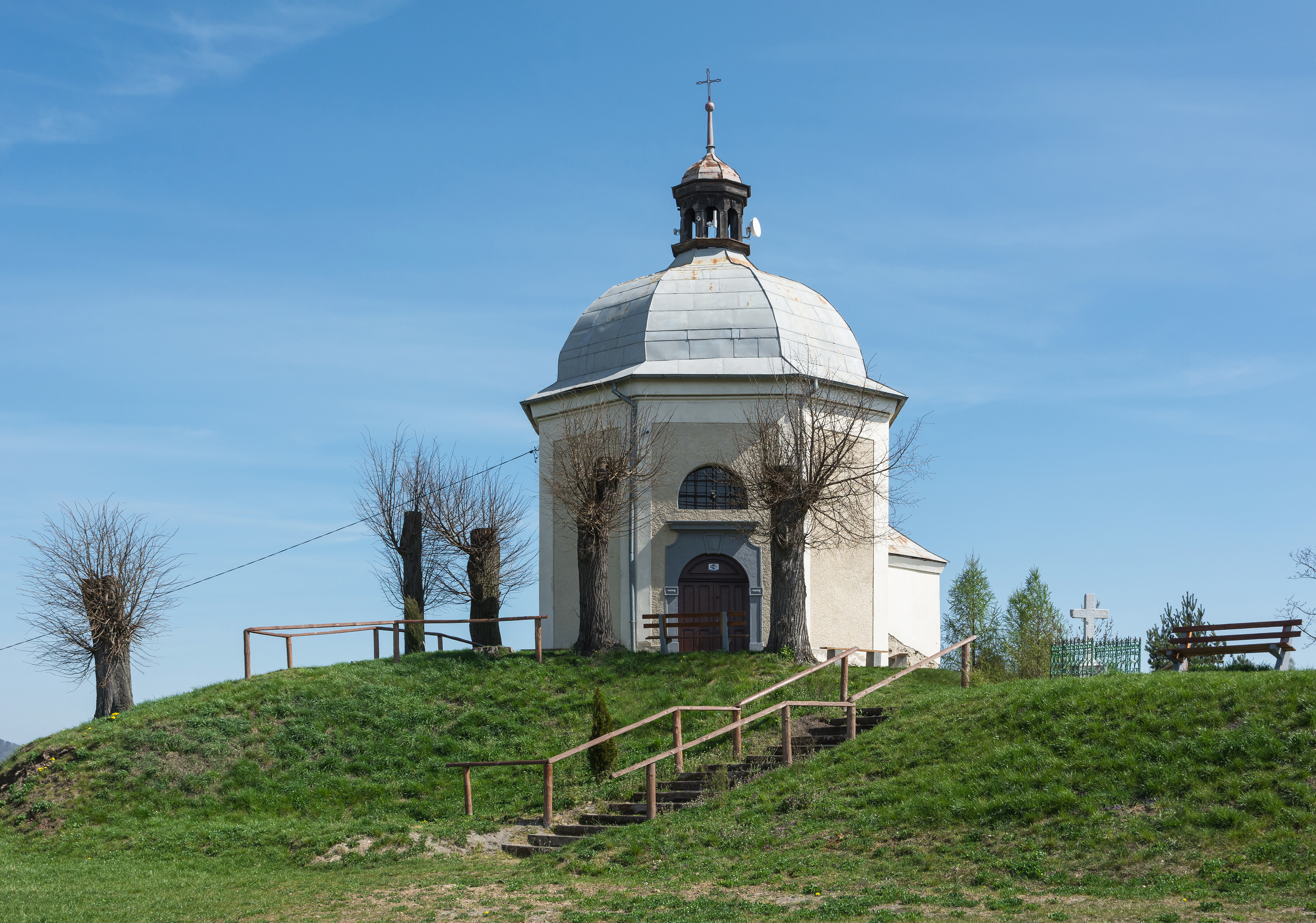
- Chapel of the Holy Cross

- Location within Poland
- Coordinates: 50°27′47″N 16°40′48″E
- Country: Poland
- Voivodeship: Lower Silesian
- County: Kłodzko
- Gmina: Kłodzko

Boguszyn [bɔˈɡuʂɨn] is a village in the administrative district of Gmina Kłodzko, within Kłodzko County, Lower Silesian Voivodeship, in south-western Poland.

The settlement is part of historic Kłodzko Land.

Friedrichswartha was founded in 1777, after the conquest of the County of Kladsko by the Prussian king Frederick the Great in the course of the First Silesian War 1740–42. A former gord on the ancient Amber Road near the border of Bohemia with the Kingdom of Poland was already mentioned in 1086, later named Burgstädtel. From 1815 it was incorporated into the Prussian Silesia Province. After World War II, the German population was expelled and the village renamed. Until 1998 it was part of Wałbrzych Voivodeship.
