= Łączna, Kłodzko County =

Łączna
- Village
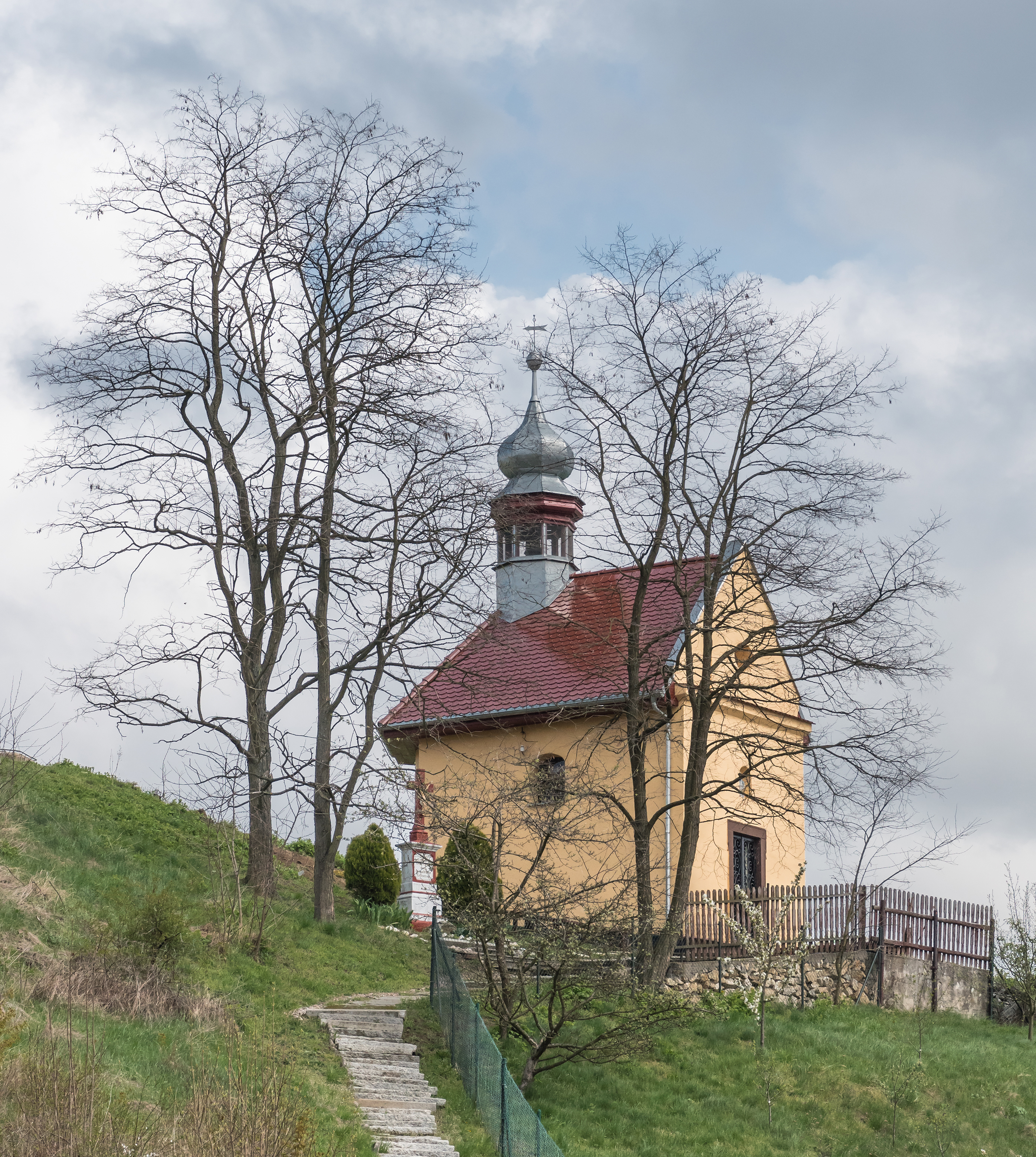

- Location within Poland
- Coordinates: 50°29′41″N 16°37′32″E
- Country: Poland
- Voivodeship: Lower Silesian
- County: Kłodzko
- Gmina: Kłodzko
- Highest elevation: 430 m (1,410 ft)
- Population (approx.): 330

Łączna [ˈwɔnt͡ʂna] is a village in the administrative district of Gmina Kłodzko, within Kłodzko County, Lower Silesian Voivodeship, in south-western Poland.
