= Mikowice, Lower Silesian Voivodeship =

Mikowice
- Village
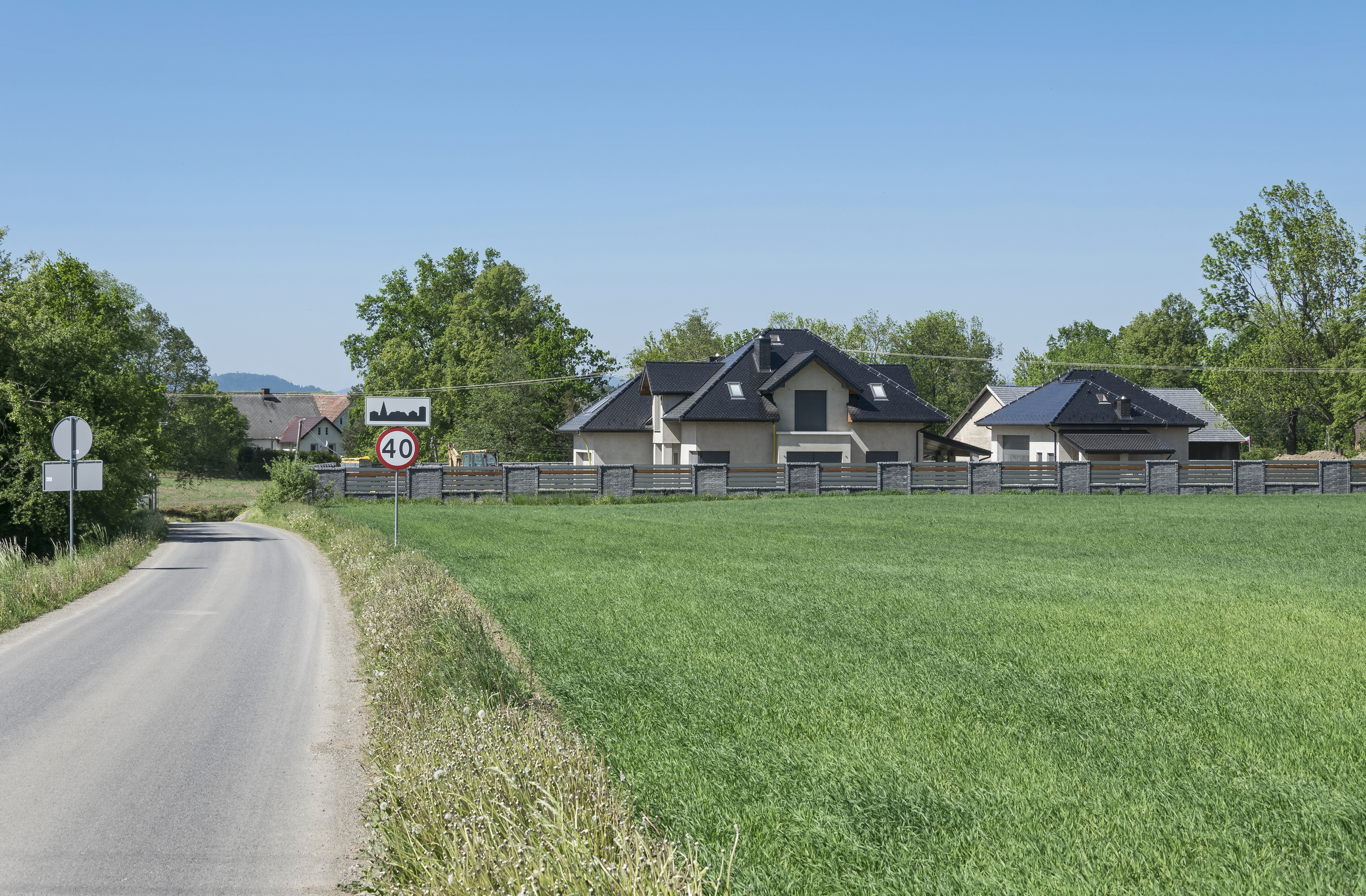
- Mikowice

- Location within Poland
- Coordinates: 50°26′39″N 16°36′24″E
- Country: Poland
- Voivodeship: Lower Silesian
- County: Kłodzko
- Gmina: Kłodzko

Population
  - Total: 84

Mikowice [mikɔˈvit͡sɛ] is a village in the administrative district of Gmina Kłodzko, within Kłodzko County, Lower Silesian Voivodeship, in south-western Poland.
