= Bierkowice, Lower Silesian Voivodeship =

Bierkowice
- Village
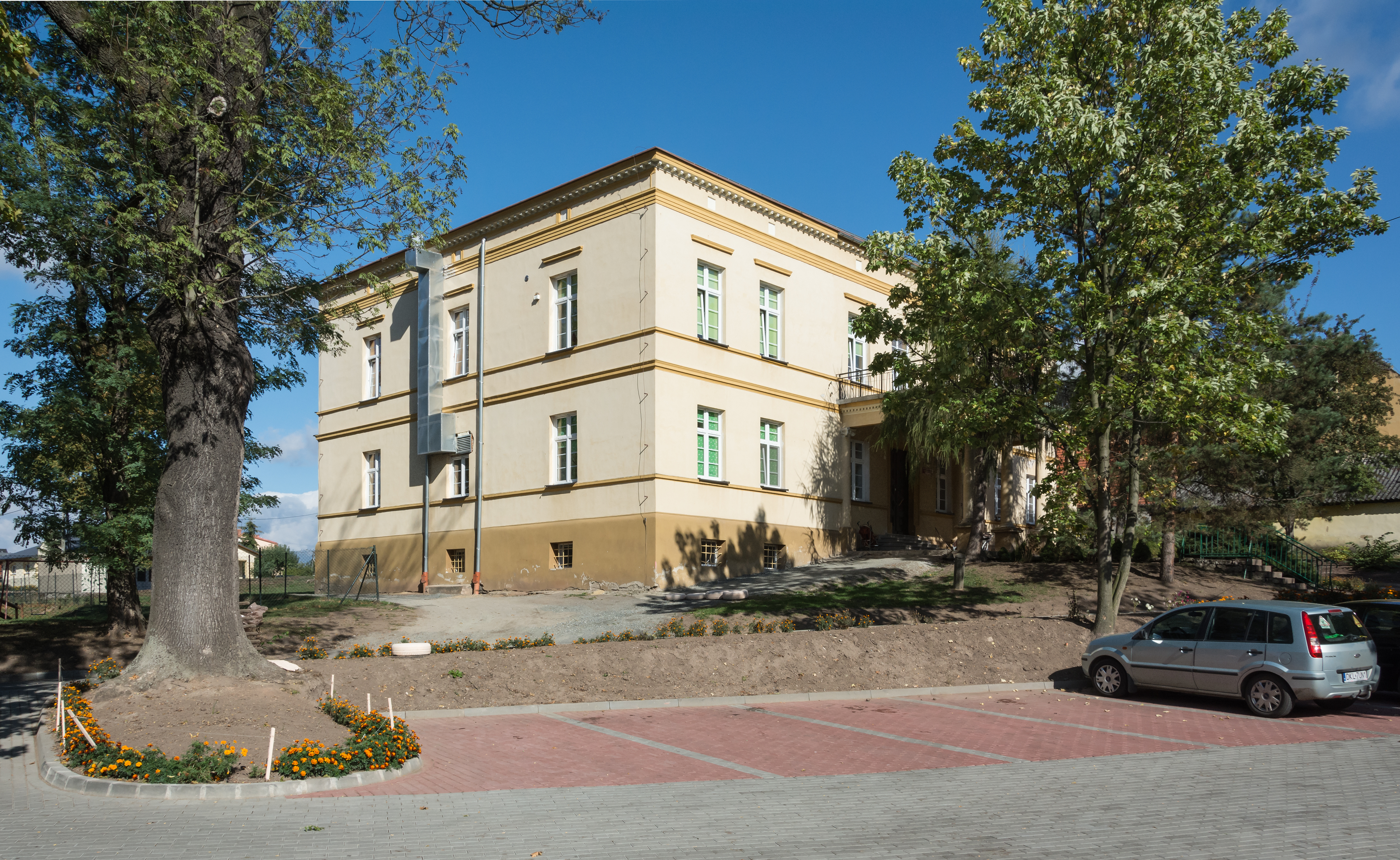
- Manor in the village

- Location within Poland
- Coordinates: 50°28′38″N 16°36′21″E
- Country: Poland
- Voivodeship: Lower Silesian
- County: Kłodzko
- Gmina: Kłodzko

Bierkowice [bjɛrkɔˈvit͡sɛ] is a village in the administrative district of Gmina Kłodzko, within Kłodzko County, Lower Silesian Voivodeship, in south-western Poland.
