= Gmina Kłodzko =

Gmina Kłodzko Kłodzko Commune
- Gmina
- Coat of arms
- Interactive map of Gmina Kłodzko
- Coordinates (Kłodzko): 50°26′16″N 16°39′10″E
- Country: Poland
- Voivodeship: Lower Silesian
- County: Kłodzko
- Seat: Kłodzko

Area
  - Total: 252.25 km^{2} (97.39 sq mi)

Population (2024-12-31)
  - Total: 16,369
  - Density: 64.892/km^{2} (168.07/sq mi)
- Website: http://www.gmina.klodzko.pl/

Gmina Kłodzko is a rural gmina (administrative district) in Kłodzko County, Lower Silesian Voivodeship, in south-western Poland. Its seat is the town of Kłodzko, although the town is not part of the territory of the gmina.

The gmina covers an area of 252.25 square kilometres (97.4 sq mi), and as of 2024 its total population is 16,369.

== Neighbouring gminas ==
Gmina Kłodzko is bordered by the towns of Kłodzko and Polanica-Zdrój, and the gminas of Bardo, Bystrzyca Kłodzka, Lądek-Zdrój, Nowa Ruda, Radków, Stoszowice, Szczytna and Złoty Stok.

== Villages ==
The gmina contains the villages of Bierkowice, Boguszyn, Droszków, Gołogłowy, Gorzuchów, Jaszkowa Dolna, Jaszkowa Górna, Jaszkówka, Kamieniec, Korytów, Krosnowice, Łączna, Ławica, Marcinów, Mikowice, Młynów, Morzyszów, Ołdrzychowice Kłodzkie, Piszkowice, Podtynie, Podzamek, Rogówek, Romanowo, Roszyce, Ruszowice, Ścinawica, Starków, Stary Wielisław, Święcko, Szalejów Dolny, Szalejów Górny, Wilcza, Wojbórz, Wojciechowice and Żelazno.

== Twin towns – sister cities ==
Gmina Kłodzko is twinned with:

- Georgsmarienhütte, Germany
- Rytro, Poland
- Zbąszyń, Poland
