= Młynów, Lower Silesian Voivodeship =

Młynów
- Village
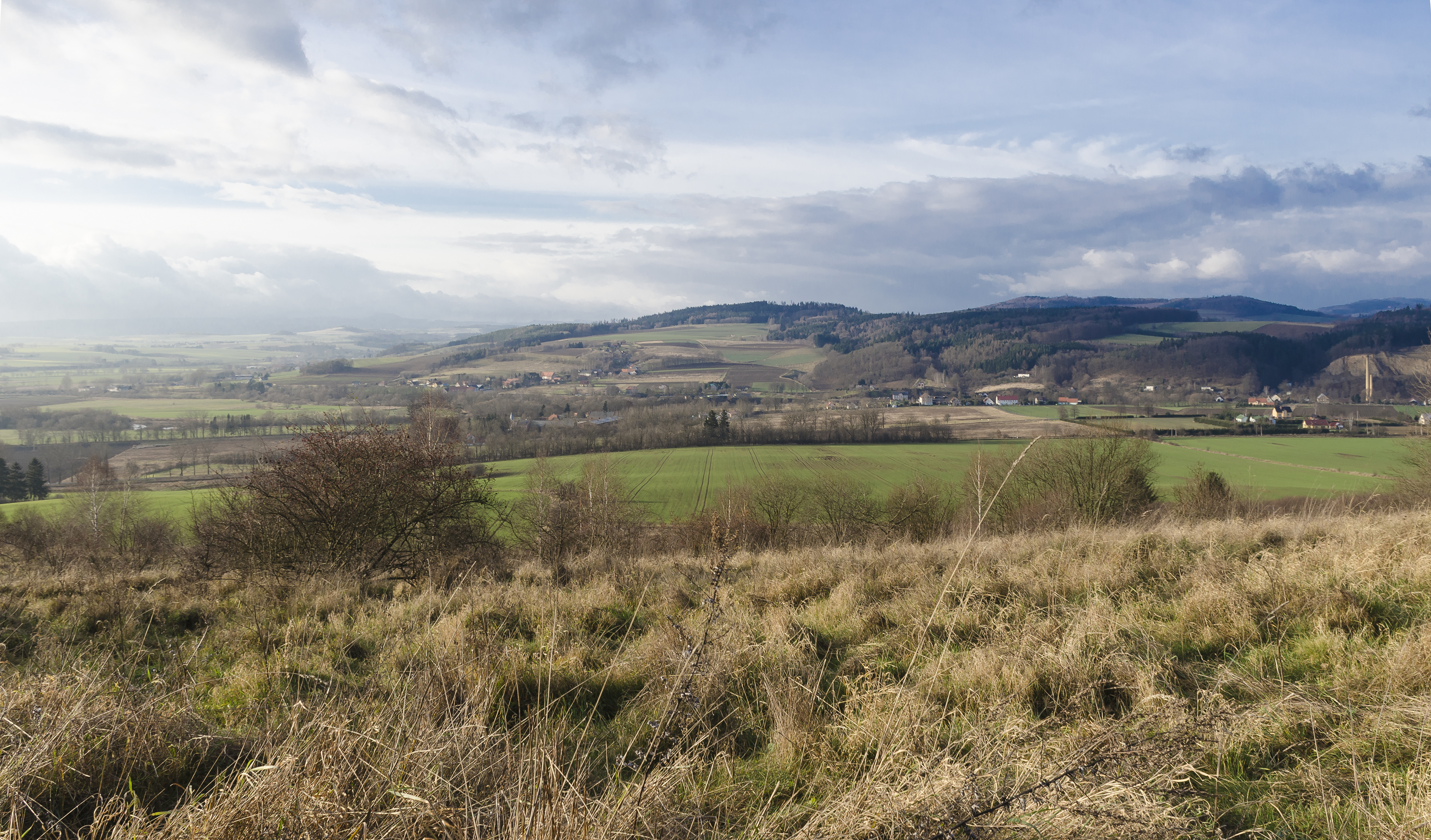
- The village seen from the southeast

- Location within Poland
- Coordinates: 50°29′N 16°40′E
- Country: Poland
- Voivodeship: Lower Silesian
- County: Kłodzko
- Gmina: Kłodzko
- Time zone: UTC+1 (CET)
  - Summer (DST): UTC+2 (CEST)
- Vehicle registration: DKL

Młynów [ˈmwɨnuf] is a village in the administrative district of Gmina Kłodzko, within Kłodzko County, Lower Silesian Voivodeship, in south-western Poland.

== History ==
In the Middle Ages, the village was at various times part of Poland and Bohemia. In the 18th century it was annexed by Prussia, and from 1871 it was also part of Germany. During World War II, the Germans operated the E454 forced labour subcamp of the Stalag VIII-B/344 prisoner-of-war camp in the village. Following Germany's defeat in the war, in 1945, the area became again part of Poland.
