= Ruszowice, Kłodzko County =

Ruszowice
- Village
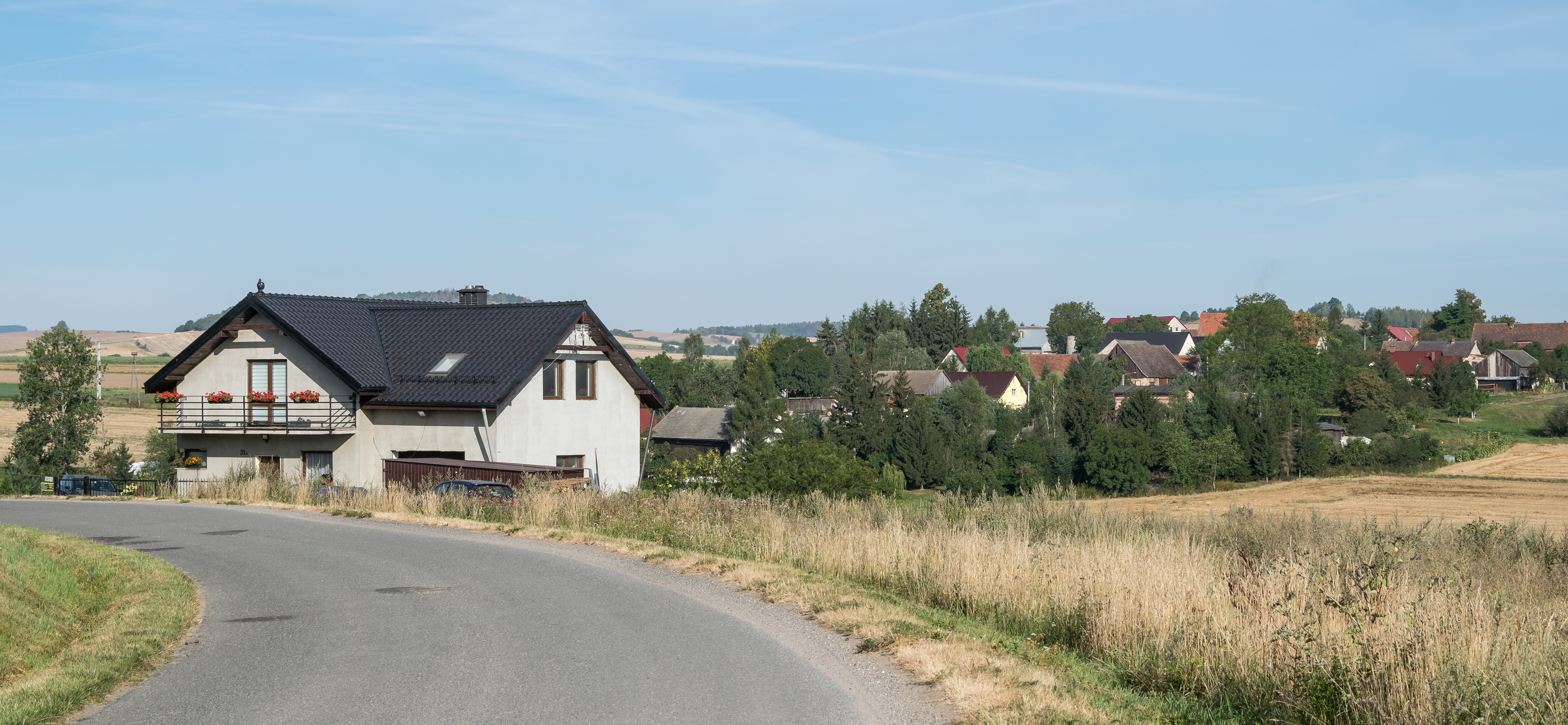

- Location within Poland
- Coordinates: 50°27′52″N 16°34′20″E
- Country: Poland
- Voivodeship: Lower Silesian
- County: Kłodzko
- Gmina: Kłodzko
- Highest elevation: 360 m (1,180 ft)

Population
  - Total: 144

Ruszowice [ruʂɔˈvit͡sɛ] is a village in the administrative district of Gmina Kłodzko, within Kłodzko County, Lower Silesian Voivodeship, in south-western Poland.
