= Droszków, Lower Silesian Voivodeship =

Droszków
- Village
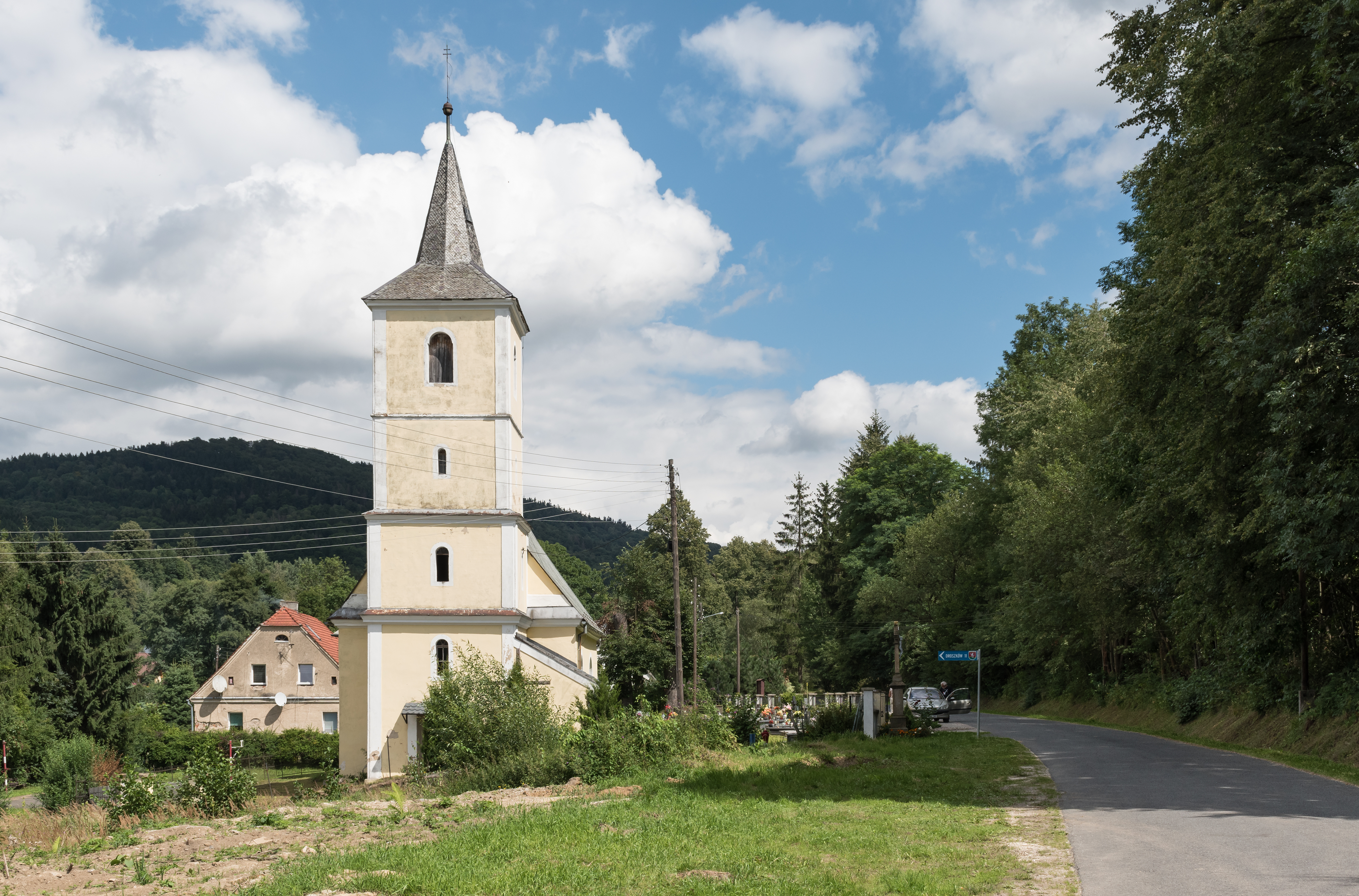
- Church of Saint Barbara

- Location within Poland
- Coordinates: 50°23′41″N 16°47′01″E
- Country: Poland
- Voivodeship: Lower Silesian
- County: Kłodzko
- Gmina: Kłodzko

Droszków [ˈdrɔʂkuf] is a village in the administrative district of Gmina Kłodzko, within Kłodzko County, Lower Silesian Voivodeship, in south-western Poland.
