= Rogówek, Kłodzko County =

Rogówek
- Village
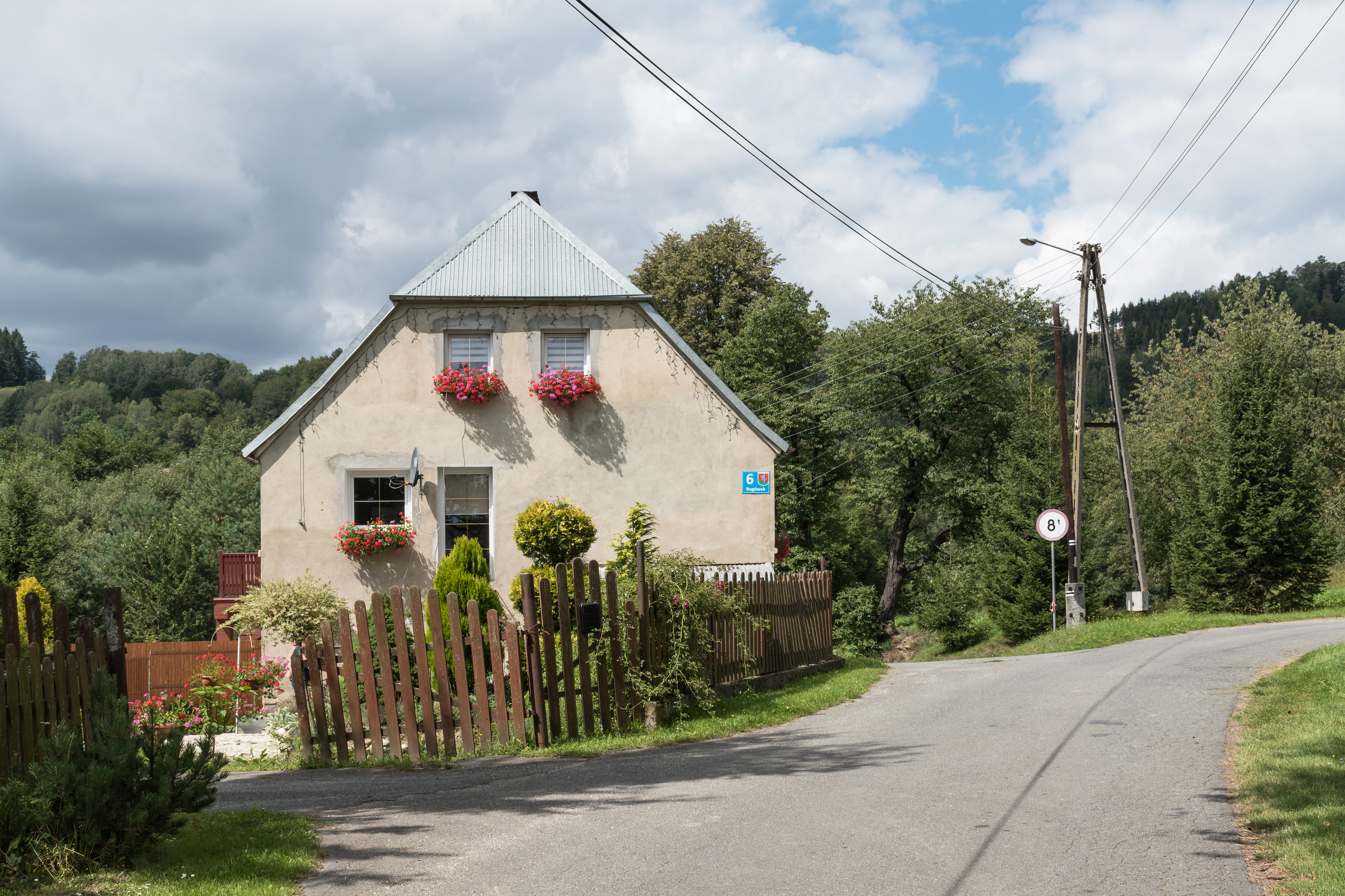

- Location within Poland
- Coordinates: 50°22′45″N 16°44′30″E
- Country: Poland
- Voivodeship: Lower Silesian
- County: Kłodzko
- Gmina: Kłodzko

Rogówek [rɔˈɡuvɛk] is a village in the administrative district of Gmina Kłodzko, within Kłodzko County, Lower Silesian Voivodeship, in south-western Poland.
