= Szalejów Górny =

- Village
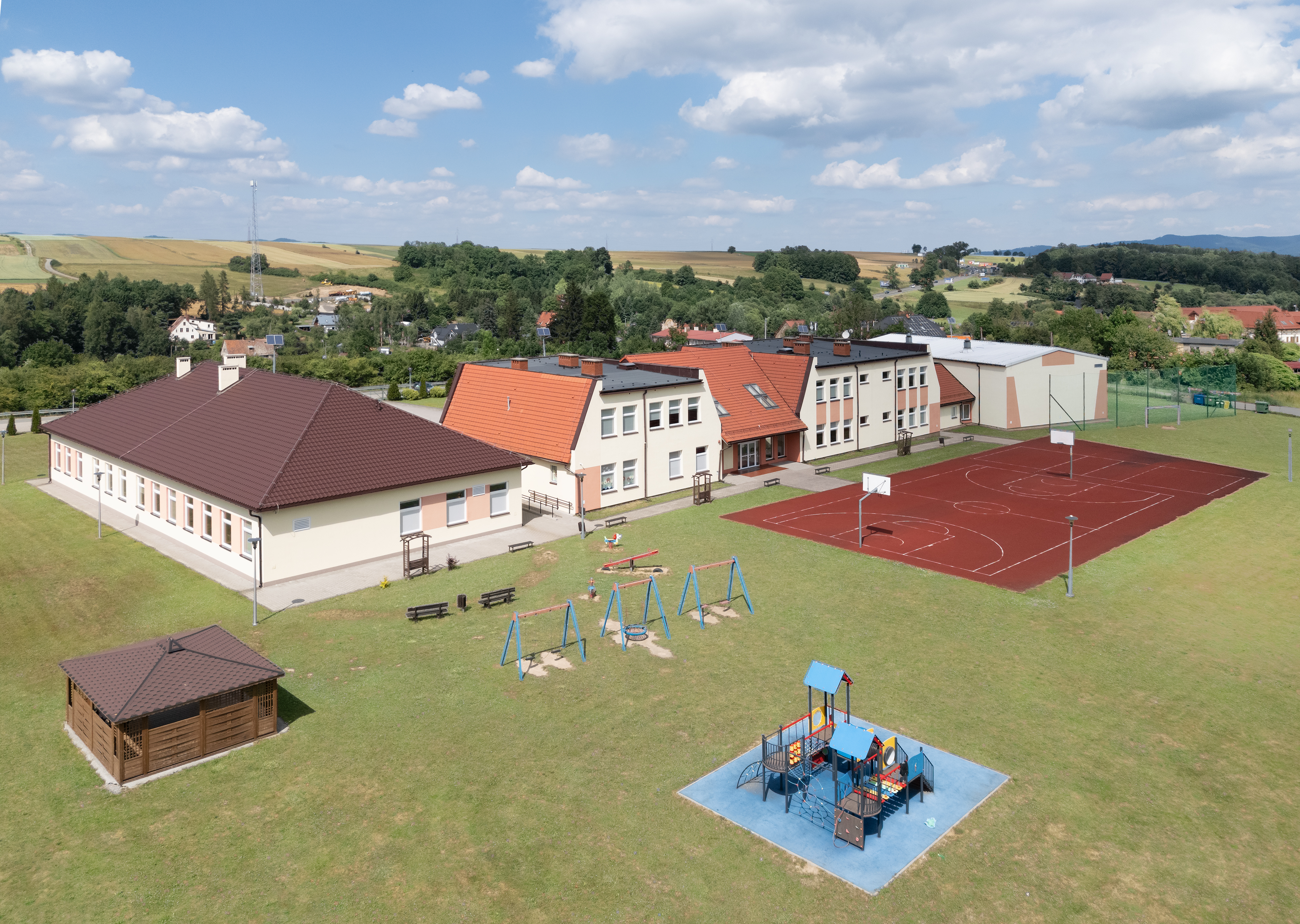
- School

- Location within Poland
- Coordinates: 50°26′N 16°33′E
- Country: Poland
- Voivodeship: Lower Silesian
- County: Kłodzko
- Gmina: Kłodzko

Szalejów Górny [ʂaˈlɛjuf ˈɡurnɨ] is a village in the administrative district of Gmina Kłodzko, within Kłodzko County, Lower Silesian Voivodeship, in south-western Poland.
