= Kłodzko County =

Coordinates: 50°26′16″N 16°39′10″E

Kłodzko County Powiat kłodzki
- County
- Flag Coat of arms

- Location within the voivodeship
- Country: Poland
- Voivodeship: Lower Silesian
- Seat: Kłodzko
- Gminas: Total 14 (incl. 5 urban): Duszniki-Zdrój; Kłodzko; Kudowa-Zdrój; Nowa Ruda; Polanica-Zdrój; Gmina Bystrzyca Kłodzka; Gmina Kłodzko; Gmina Lądek-Zdrój; Gmina Lewin Kłodzki; Gmina Międzylesie; Gmina Nowa Ruda; Gmina Radków; Gmina Stronie Śląskie; Gmina Szczytna

Area
  - Total: 1,643.37 km^{2} (634.51 sq mi)

Population (2019-06-30)
  - Total: 158,600
  - Density: 96.51/km^{2} (250.0/sq mi)
  - Urban: 101,249
  - Rural: 57,351
- Car plates: DKL
- Website: www.powiat.klodzko.pl

Kłodzko County (Polish: powiat kłodzki) is a unit of territorial administration and local government (powiat) in Lower Silesian Voivodeship, south-western Poland. It came into being on 1 January 1999 as a result of the Polish local government reforms passed in 1998.

The county covers an area of 1,643 square kilometres (634 sq mi); its territory almost exactly corresponds to the former Bohemian, later Prussian, County of Kladsko. It is located in a panhandle called Kłodzko Panhandle. The county's administrative seat is the town of Kłodzko; the other towns are: Duszniki-Zdrój, Nowa Ruda, Polanica-Zdrój, Bystrzyca Kłodzka, Kudowa-Zdrój, Lądek-Zdrój, Międzylesie, Radków, Stronie Śląskie and Szczytna. (The suffix Zdrój appearing in several of these names means "spa".)

As of 2019 the total population of the county was 158,600.

== Neighbouring counties ==
Kłodzko County is bordered by Wałbrzych County to the north-west, Dzierżoniów County to the north and Ząbkowice County to the north-east. It also borders the Czech Republic to the east, south and west.

== Administrative divisions ==
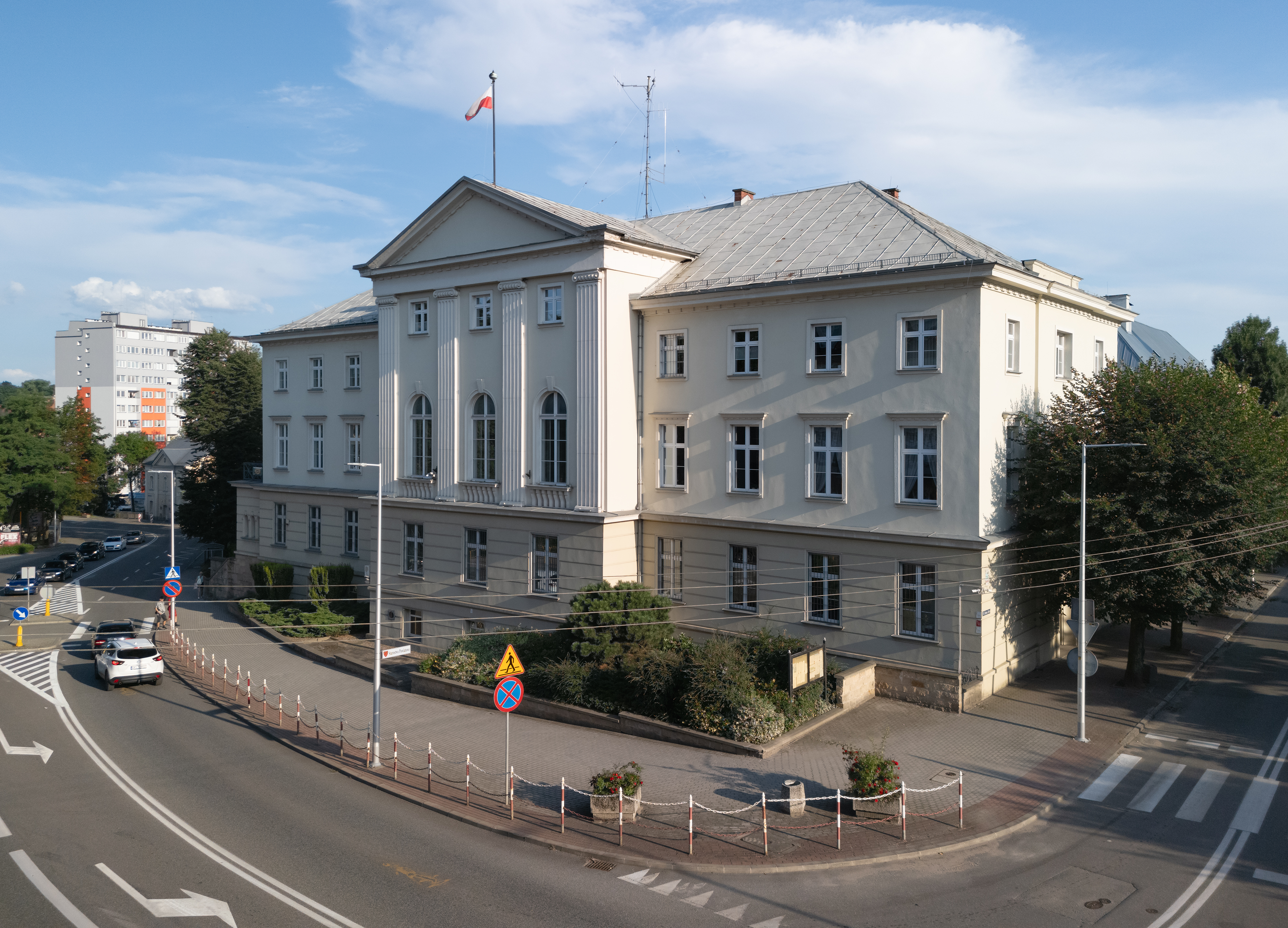
County Office in Kłodzko

The county is subdivided into 14 gminas (five urban, six urban-rural and three rural). These are listed in the following table, in descending order of population.

Gmina	Type	Area (km^{2})	Population (2019)	Seat
Kłodzko	urban	24.8	26,845	
Nowa Ruda	urban	37.1	22,067	
Gmina Bystrzyca Kłodzka	urban-rural	337.8	18,925	Bystrzyca Kłodzka
Gmina Kłodzko	rural	252.3	17,142	Kłodzko*
Gmina Nowa Ruda	rural	139.7	11,599	Nowa Ruda*
Kudowa-Zdrój	urban	33.9	9,892	
Gmina Radków	urban-rural	139.0	9,048	Radków
Gmina Lądek-Zdrój	urban-rural	117.4	8,233	Lądek-Zdrój
Gmina Stronie Śląskie	urban-rural	146.4	7,539	Stronie Śląskie
Gmina Szczytna	urban-rural	133.2	7,276	Szczytna
Gmina Międzylesie	urban-rural	189.0	7,186	Międzylesie
Polanica-Zdrój	urban	17.2	6,324	
Duszniki-Zdrój	urban	22.3	4,584	
Gmina Lewin Kłodzki	rural	52.2	1,940	Lewin Kłodzki
* seat not part of the gmina
