= Stronie Śląskie =

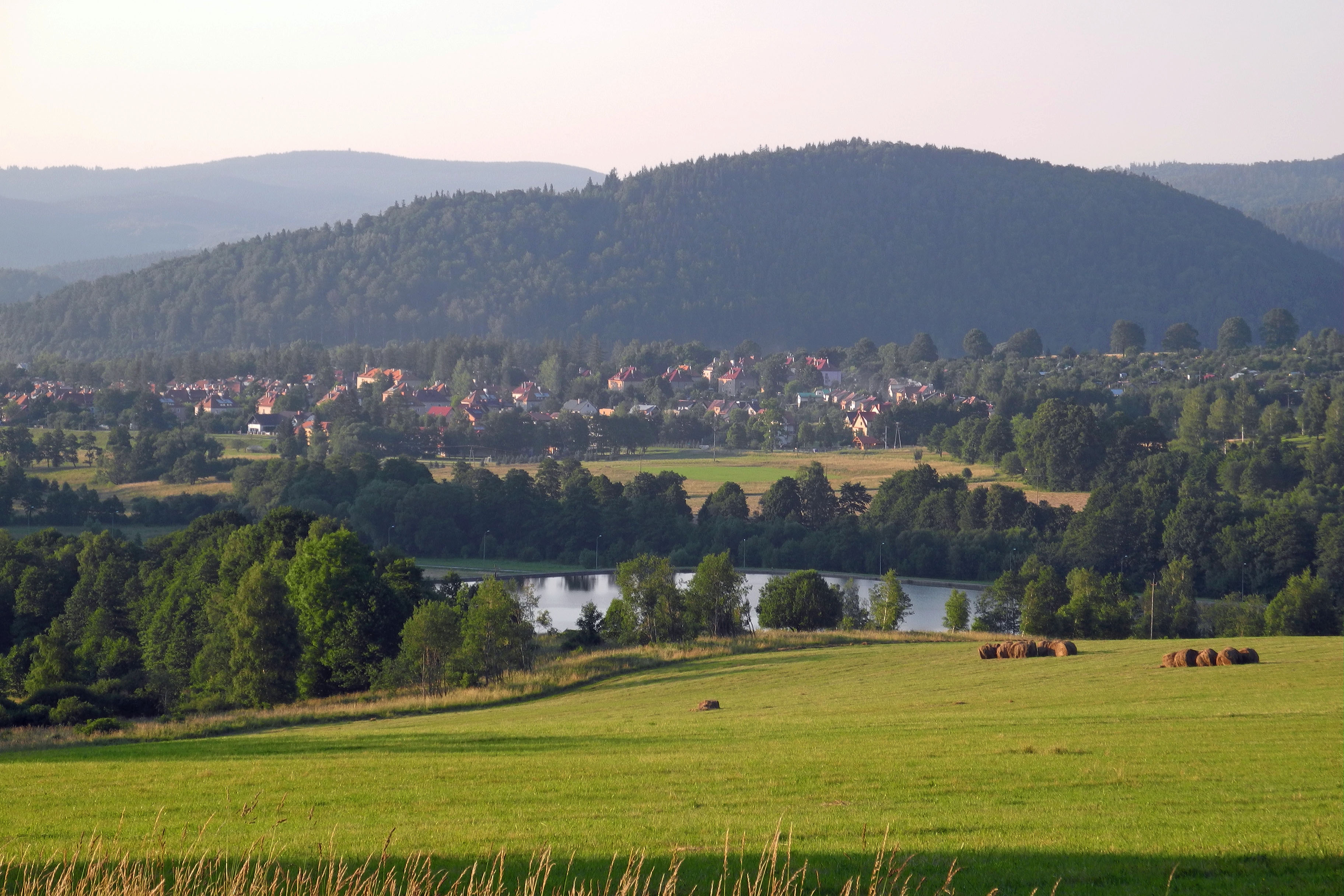
- View of Stronie Śląskie with the Sudetes in the background

- Flag Coat of arms

- Location within Poland
- Coordinates: 50°17′44″N 16°52′39″E
- Country: Poland
- Voivodeship: Lower Silesian
- County: Kłodzko
- Gmina: Stronie Śląskie
- Town rights: 1967

Area
  - Total: 2.49 km^{2} (0.96 sq mi)
- Highest elevation: 610 m (2,000 ft)
- Lowest elevation: 500 m (1,600 ft)

Population (2019-06-30)
  - Total: 5,709
  - Density: 2,290/km^{2} (5,940/sq mi)
- Time zone: UTC+1 (CET)
  - Summer (DST): UTC+2 (CEST)
- Postal code: 57-550
- Area code: (+48) 74
- Vehicle registration: DKL
- Website: http://www.stronie.pl

Stronie Śląskie [ˈstrɔɲɛ ˈɕlɔ̃skʲɛ] (German: Seitenberg) is a town in Kłodzko County, Lower Silesian Voivodeship, in south-western Poland. It is the seat of the administrative district (gmina) called Gmina Stronie Śląskie, close to the Czech border. It is located within the historic Kłodzko Land.

As of 2019, the town has a population of 5,709.

== History ==
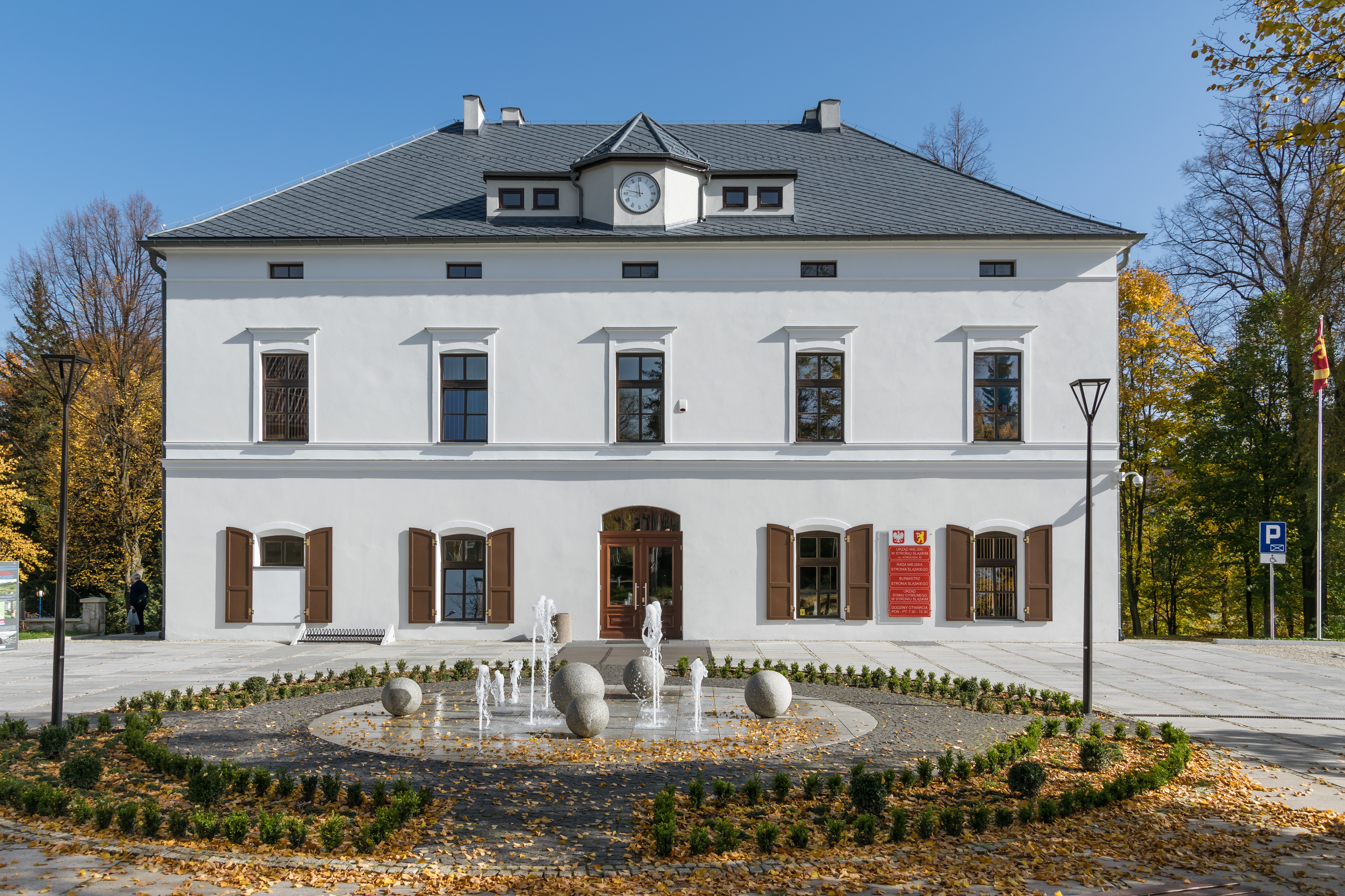
Former palace of Princess Marianne of the Netherlands, today's town hall

The settlement was founded in the 14th century. Over the centuries, it has changed owners many times.

In the mid-15th century the village became part of the County of Kladsko within the Kingdom of Bohemia. In the 16th and 17th centuries, it was part of a metal mining region. In the 17th century, the village became the center of an estate, which included also the nearby villages of Bolesławów, Kletno, Strachocin and Stara Morawa. In the 18th century, Austria ceded the village to the Kingdom of Prussia in the Treaty of Berlin. In 1838, Princess Marianne of the Netherlands bought the estates, which remained in the possession of the Dutch House of Orange-Nassau until 1908. From 1871, the village was part of the German Empire. In 1897, it was connected by rail with Glatz (Kłodzko).

After the defeat of Nazi Germany in World War II in 1945, the village became part of Poland. Its German population was expelled in accordance with the Potsdam Agreement. In 1967, Stronie Śląskie was granted town rights. The town suffered the 1997 Central European flood and the 2024 Central European floods.

== Economy ==
One of the main employers in the town in the lead crystal factory "Violetta.", which in one form or another has been in the town since 1864.

== Sights ==
Among the historic sights of Stronie Śląskie are:

- the Palace of Princess Marianne of the Netherlands, currently housing the town hall
- the Baroque Saint Onuphrius chapel
- the Baroque Our Lady Queen of Poland and Saint Maternus church
- the Romanesque Revival and Gothic Revival Christ's Resurrection church
- historic houses and villas
- the private Museum of Stones and Minerals (Muzeum Kamieni i Minerałów)
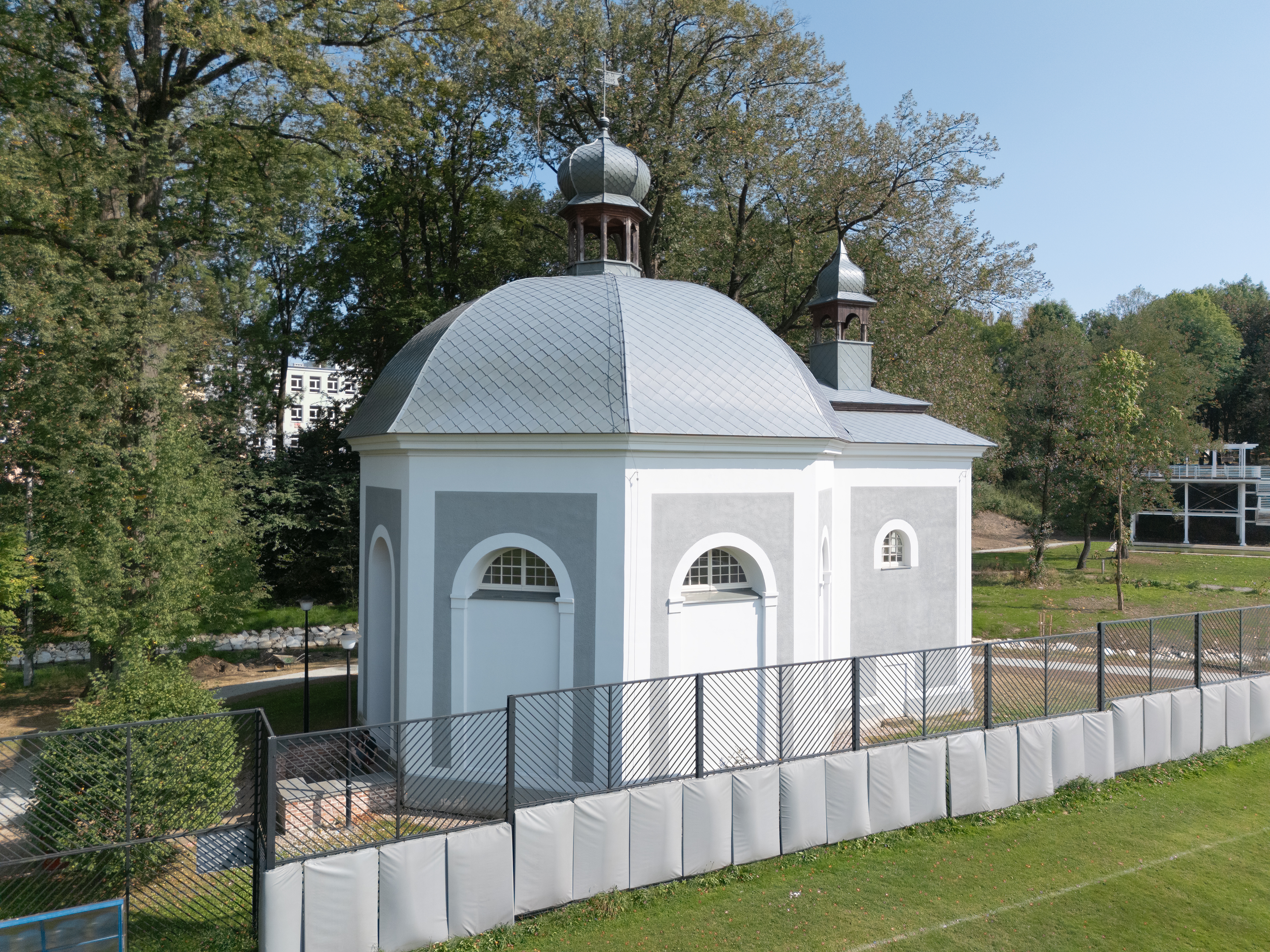
Saint Onuphrius chapel

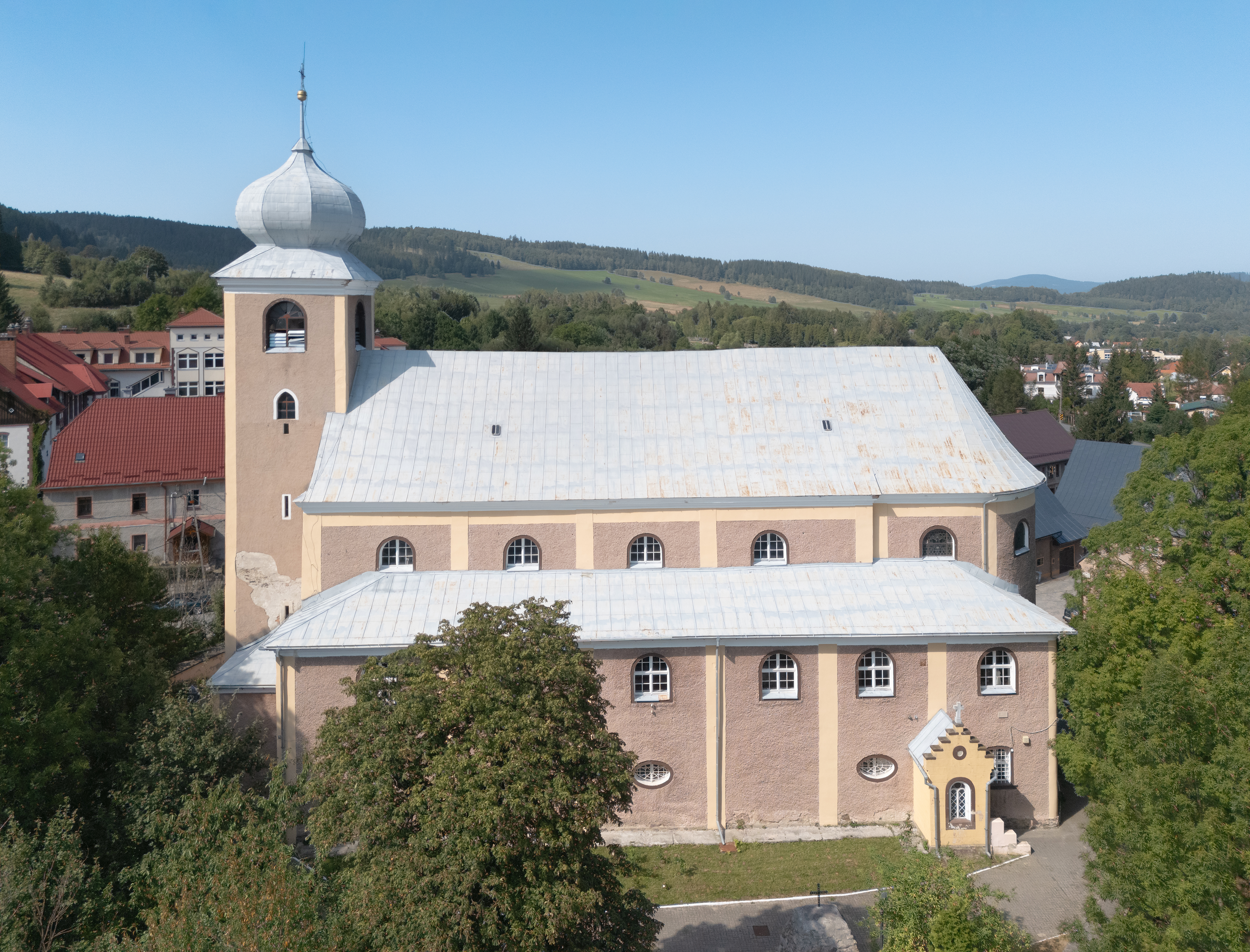
Our Lady Queen of Poland and Saint Maternus church

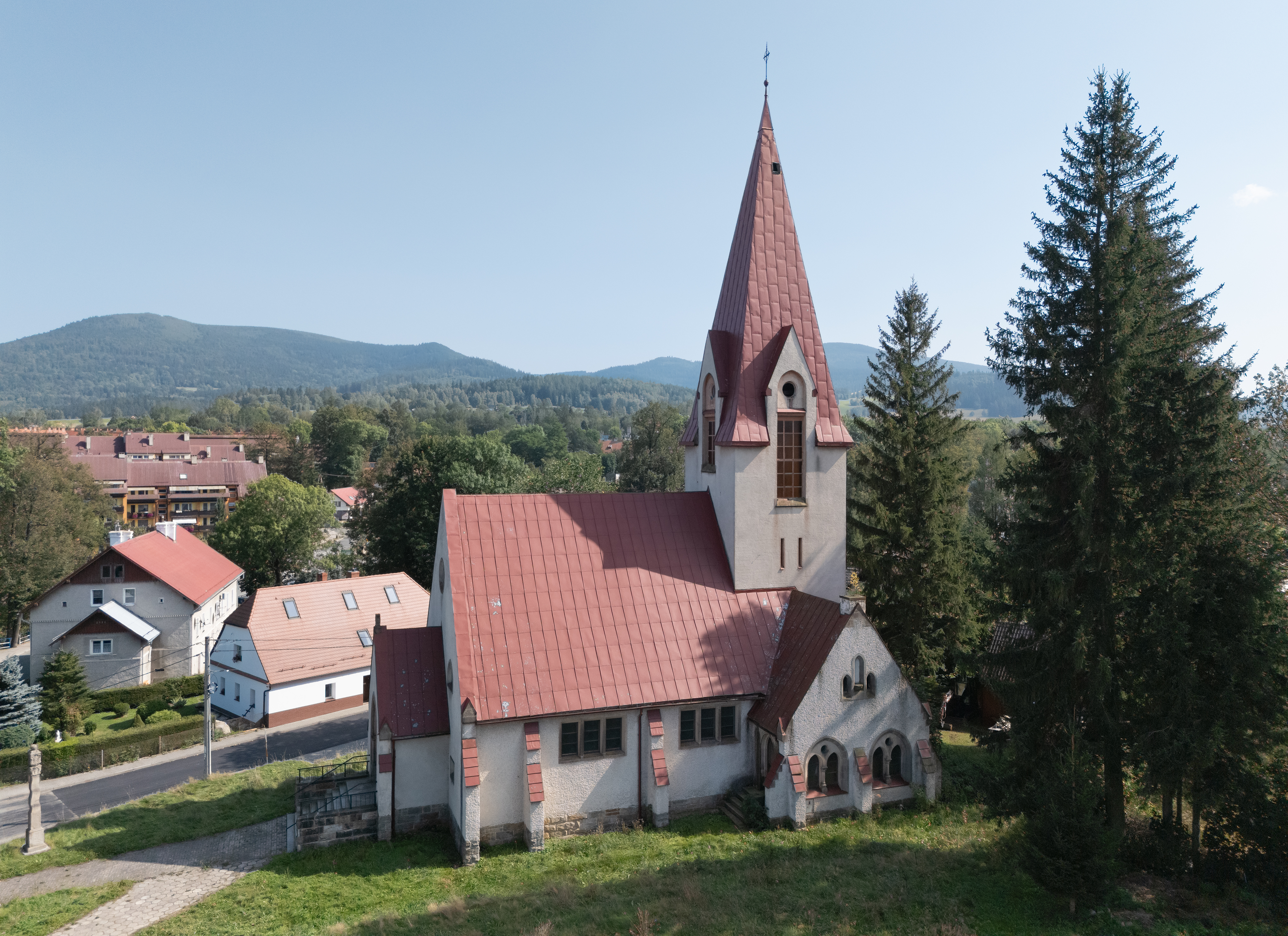
Christ's Resurrection church

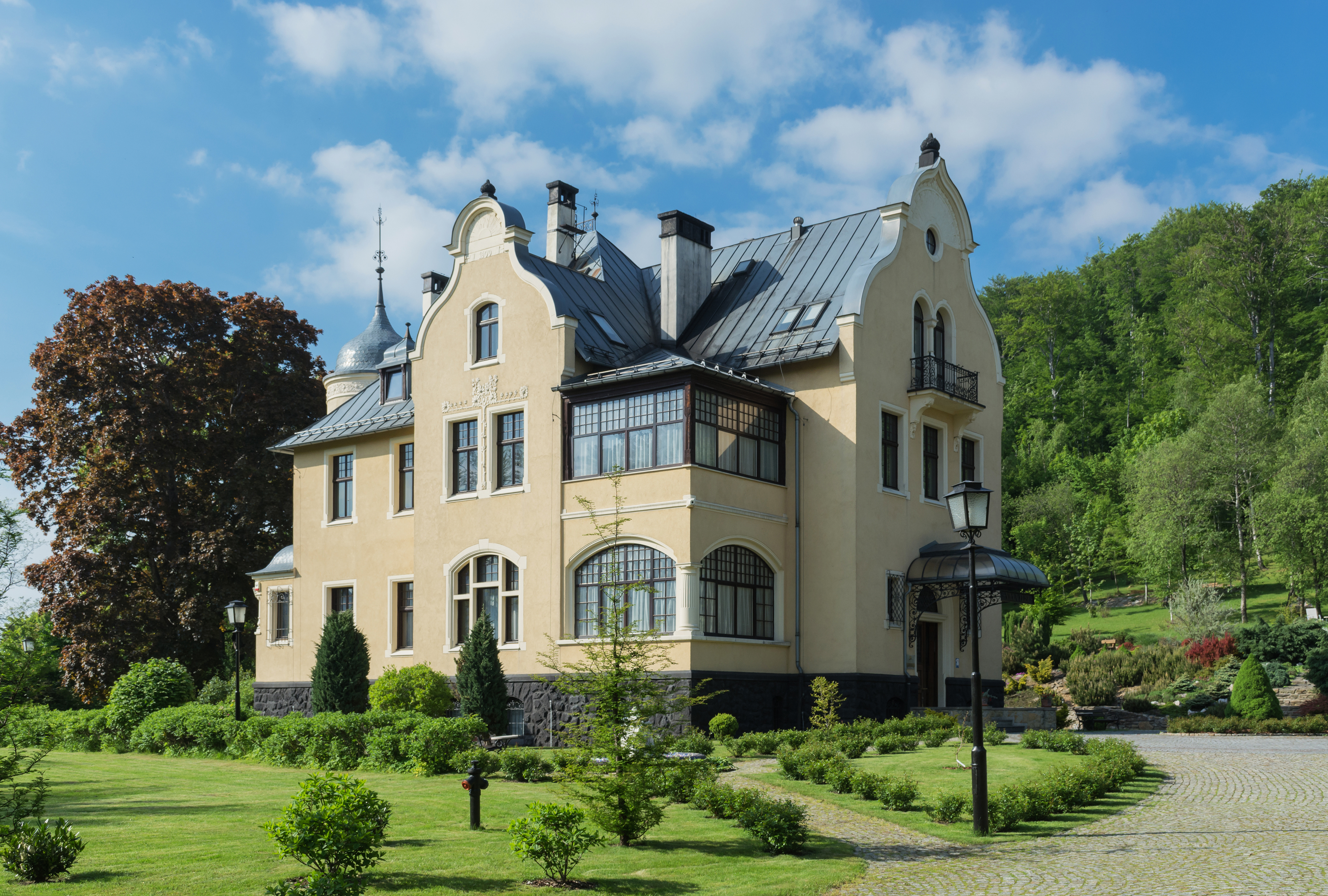
Villa Elise

== Twin towns – sister cities ==
See twin towns of Gmina Stronie Śląskie.

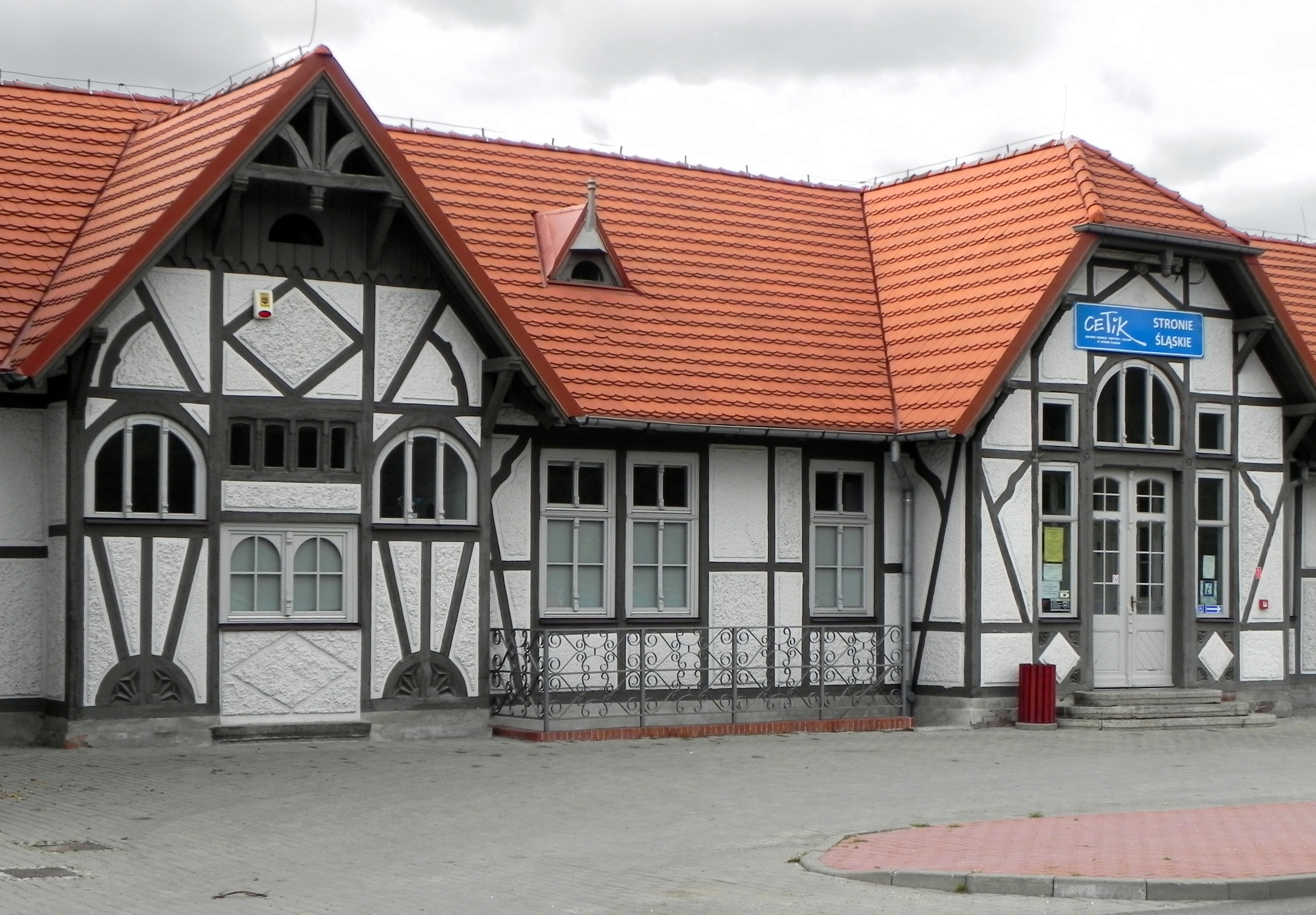
Train station
