= Rogóżka =

- Village
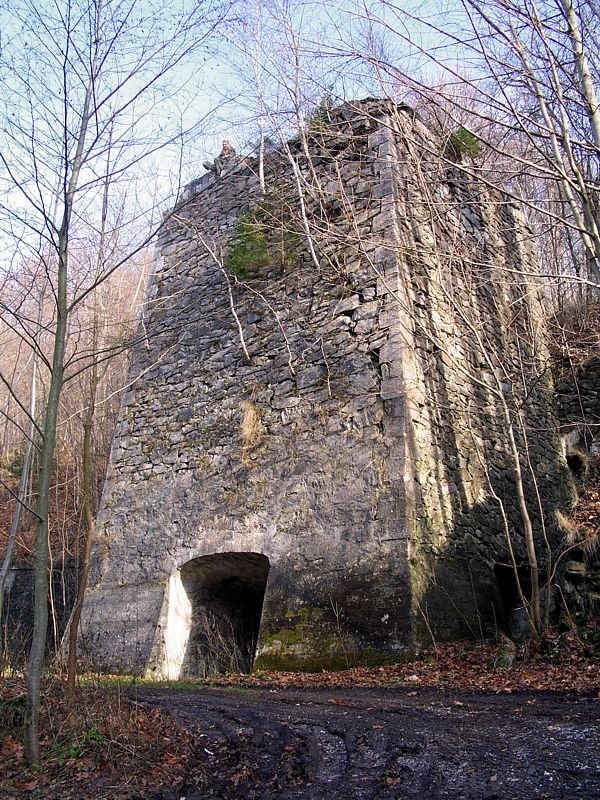

- Location within Poland
- Coordinates: 50°14′39″N 16°51′10″E
- Country: Poland
- Voivodeship: Lower Silesian
- County: Kłodzko
- Gmina: Stronie Śląskie
- Highest elevation: 740 m (2,430 ft)

Rogóżka [rɔˈɡuʂka] is a village in the administrative district of Gmina Stronie Śląskie, within Kłodzko County, Lower Silesian Voivodeship, in south-western Poland.
