= Janowa Góra =

- Village
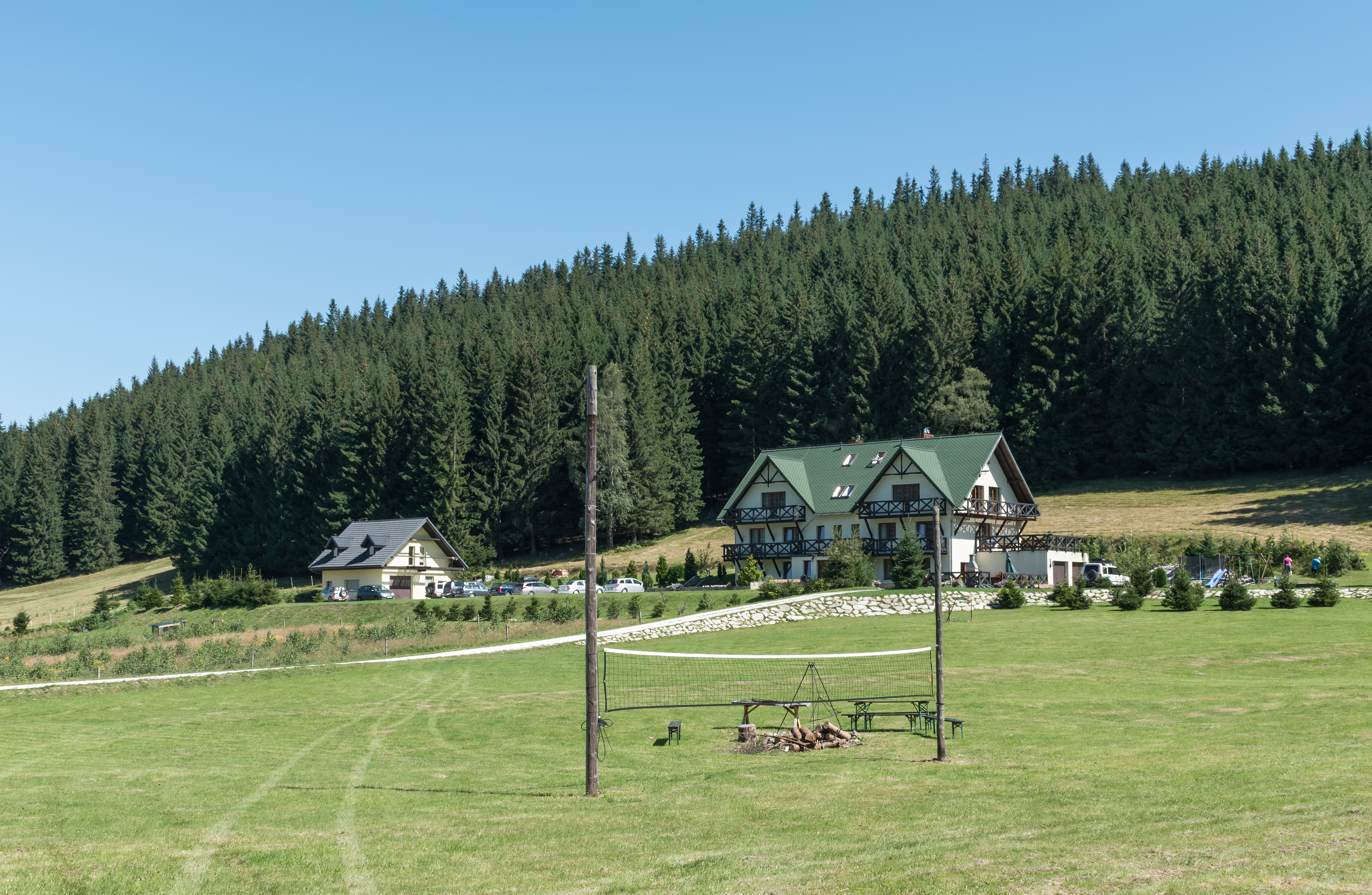

- Location within Poland
- Coordinates: 50°15′27″N 16°50′10″E
- Country: Poland
- Voivodeship: Lower Silesian
- County: Kłodzko
- Gmina: Stronie Śląskie
- Elevation (max.): 840 m (2,760 ft)
- Population: 4

Janowa Góra [jaˈnɔva ˈɡura] is a village in the administrative district of Gmina Stronie Śląskie, within Kłodzko County, Lower Silesian Voivodeship, in south-western Poland.
