= Bielice, Lower Silesian Voivodeship =

Bielice
- Village
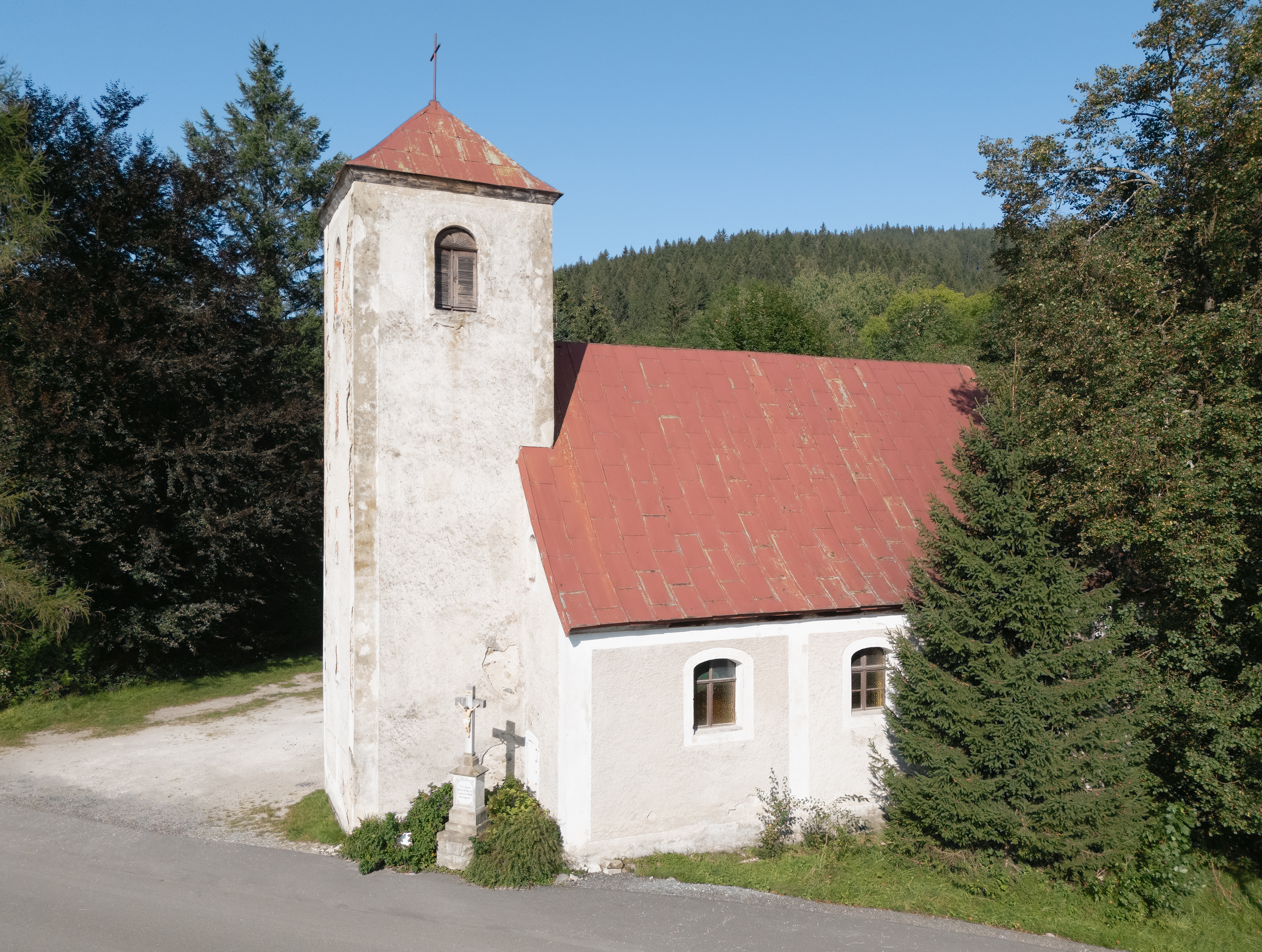

- Location within Poland
- Coordinates: 50°15′00″N 17°01′00″E
- Country: Poland
- Voivodeship: Lower Silesian
- County: Kłodzko
- Gmina: Stronie Śląskie
- Elevation (max.): 750 m (2,460 ft)
- Population: 40
- Website: http://www.bielice.info.pl

Bielice [bjɛˈlit͡sɛ] is a village in the administrative district of Gmina Stronie Śląskie, within Kłodzko County, Lower Silesian Voivodeship, in south-western Poland, near the border with the Czech Republic.
