= Młynowiec =

- Village
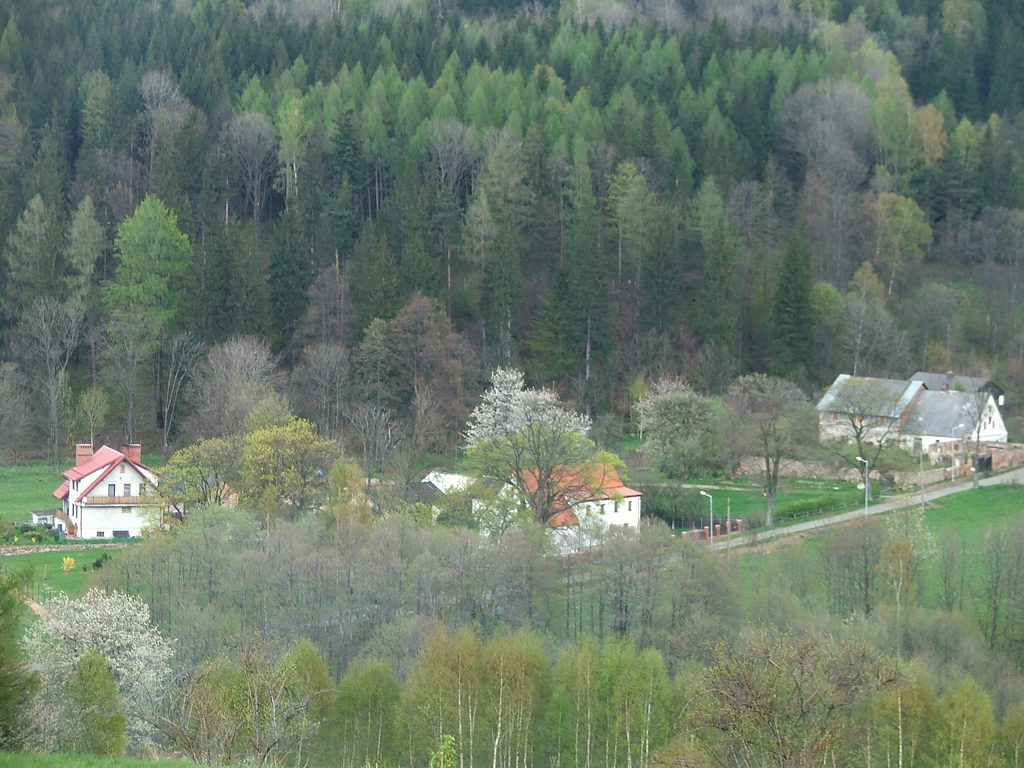
- Houses in Młynowiec

- Location within Poland
- Coordinates: 50°16′34″N 16°54′19″E
- Country: Poland
- Voivodeship: Lower Silesian
- County: Kłodzko
- Gmina: Stronie Śląskie
- Elevation (max.): 680 m (2,230 ft)

Młynowiec [mwɨˈnɔvjɛt͡s] is a village in the administrative district of Gmina Stronie Śląskie, within Kłodzko County, Lower Silesian Voivodeship, in south-western Poland.
