= Sienna, Lower Silesian Voivodeship =

Sienna
- Village
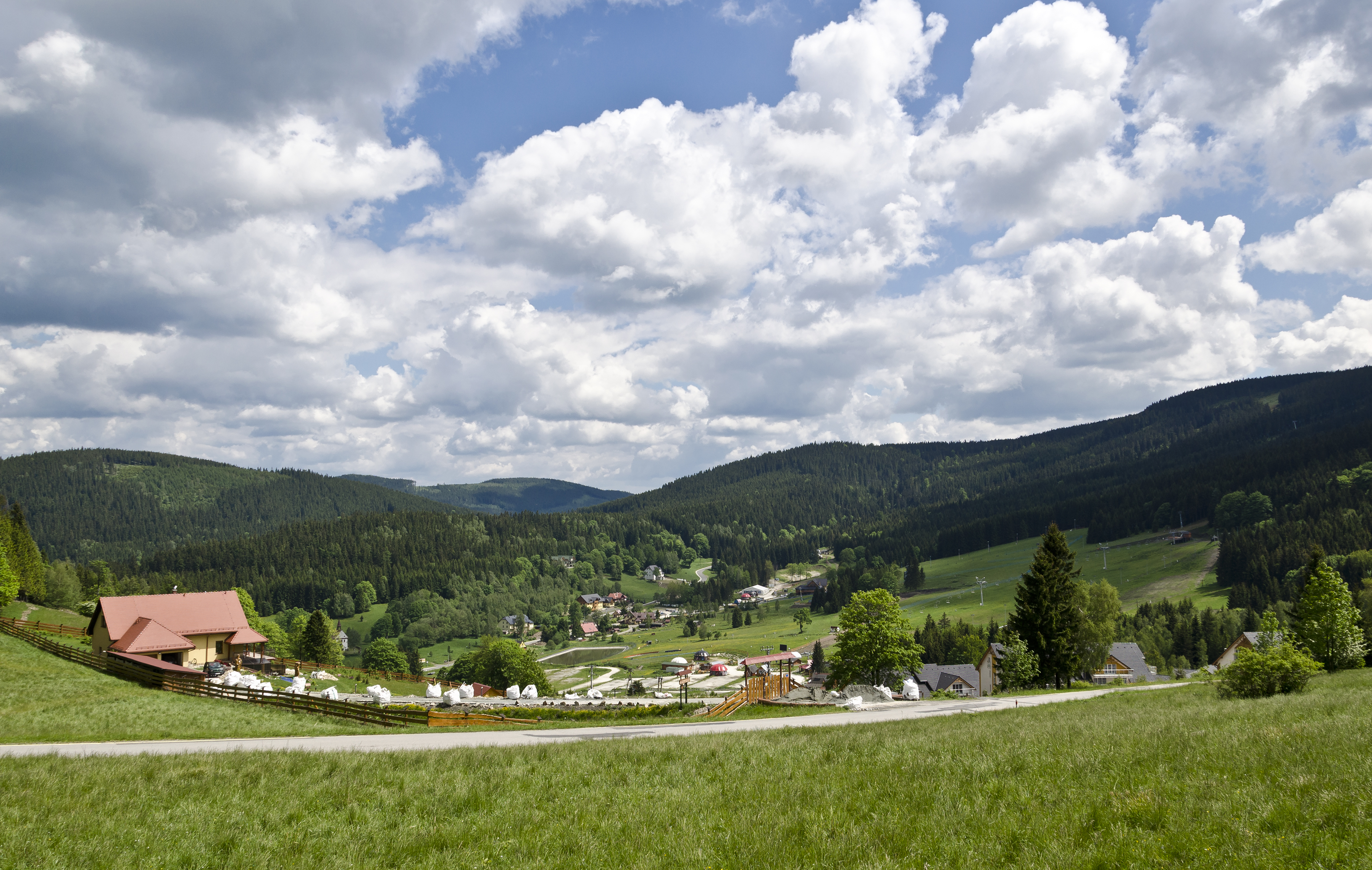

- Location within Poland
- Coordinates: 50°15′42″N 16°49′20″E
- Country: Poland
- Voivodeship: Lower Silesian
- County: Kłodzko
- Gmina: Stronie Śląskie
- Highest elevation: 830 m (2,720 ft)

Population
  - Total: 50

Sienna [ˈɕɛnna] is a village in the administrative district of Gmina Stronie Śląskie, within Kłodzko County, Lower Silesian Voivodeship, in south-western Poland.

The ski centre Czarna Gora is 1 km (1 mi) from the village centre.
