= Goszów =

- Village
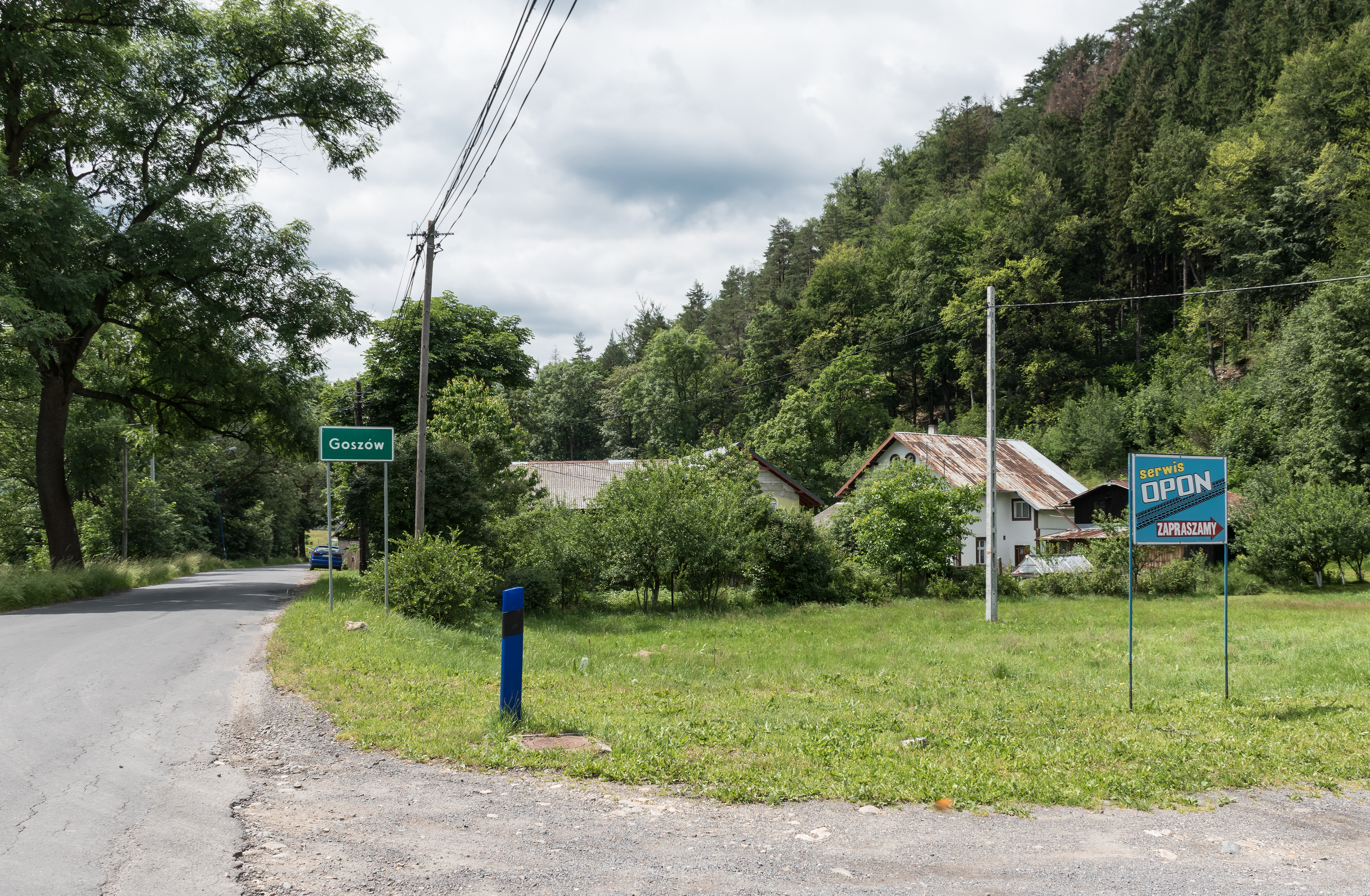

- Location within Poland
- Coordinates: 50°17′47″N 16°53′37″E
- Country: Poland
- Voivodeship: Lower Silesian
- County: Kłodzko
- Gmina: Stronie Śląskie
- Elevation (max.): 540 m (1,770 ft)

Goszów [ˈɡɔʂuf] is a village in the administrative district of Gmina Stronie Śląskie, within Kłodzko County, Lower Silesian Voivodeship, in south-western Poland.
