= Kamienica, Kłodzko County =

Kamienica
- Village
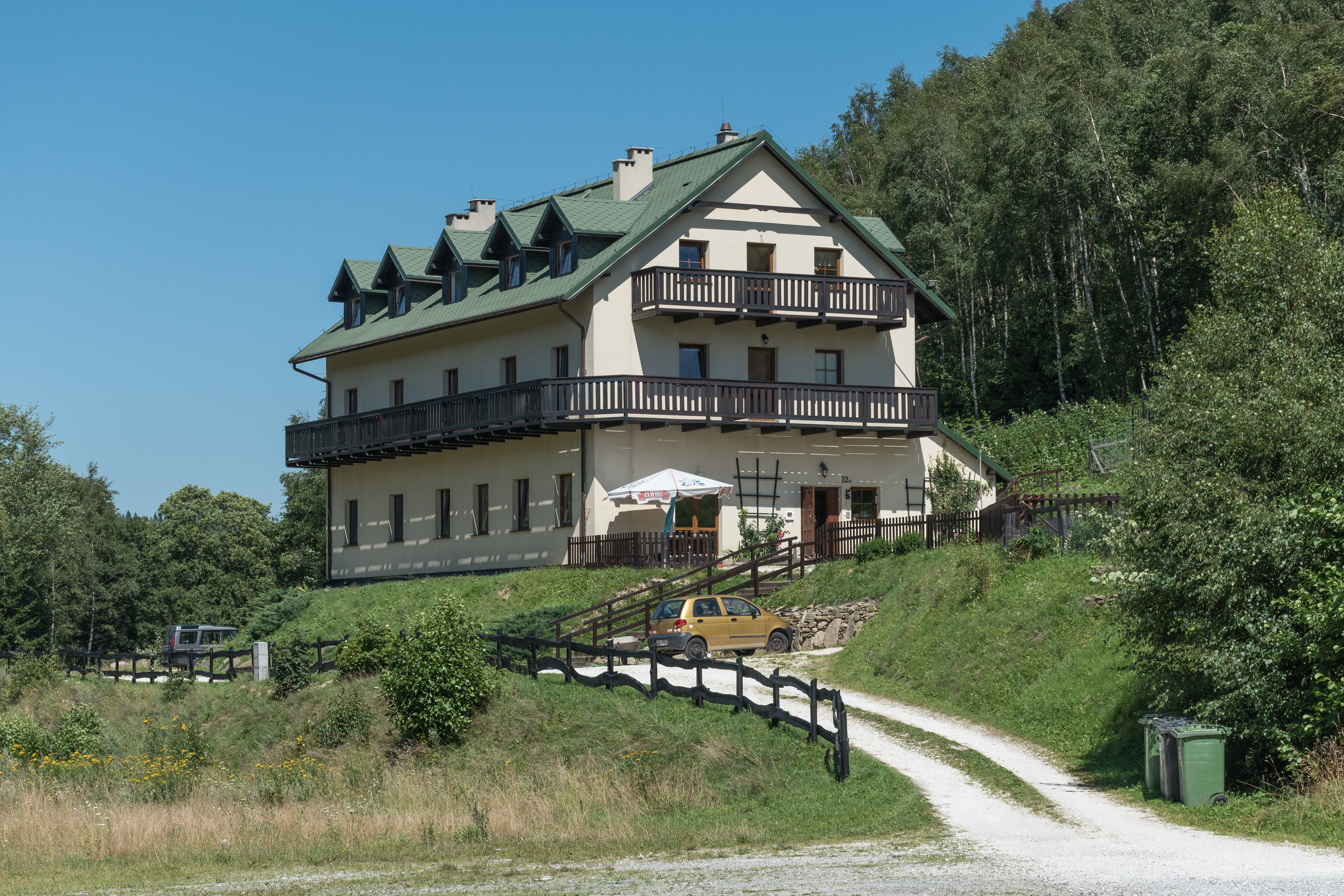

- Location within Poland
- Coordinates: 50°14′41″N 16°53′04″E
- Country: Poland
- Voivodeship: Lower Silesian
- County: Kłodzko
- Gmina: Stronie Śląskie
- Elevation (max.): 740 m (2,430 ft)

Population
  - Total: 56

Kamienica is a village in the administrative district of Gmina Stronie Śląskie, within Kłodzko County, Lower Silesian Voivodeship, in south-western Poland.
