= Nowy Gierałtów =

- Village
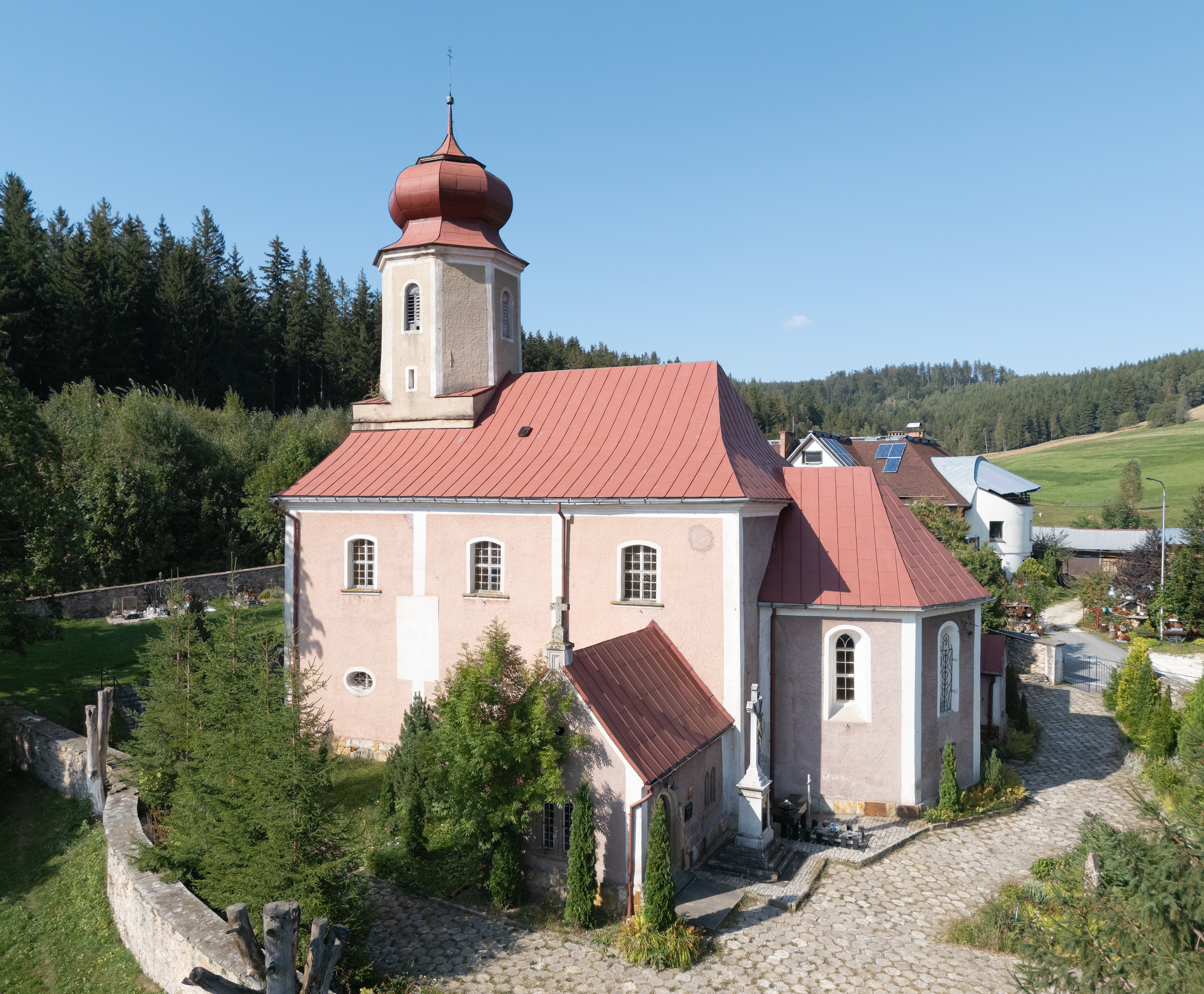

- Location within Poland
- Coordinates: 50°18′N 16°58′E
- Country: Poland
- Voivodeship: Lower Silesian
- County: Kłodzko
- Gmina: Stronie Śląskie
- Elevation (max.): 680 m (2,230 ft)

Nowy Gierałtów [ˈnɔvɨ ɡʲɛˈrau̯tuf] is a village in the administrative district of Gmina Stronie Śląskie, within Kłodzko County, Lower Silesian Voivodeship, in south-western Poland, near the border with the Czech Republic.
