= Gmina Stronie Śląskie =

Gmina Stronie Śląskie Stronie Śląskie Commune
- Gmina
- Flag Coat of arms
- Interactive map of Gmina Stronie Śląskie
- Coordinates (Stronie Śląskie): 50°17′44″N 16°52′39″E
- Country: Poland
- Voivodeship: Lower Silesian
- County: Kłodzko
- Seat: Stronie Śląskie
- Sołectwos: Bielice, Bolesławów, Goszów; Janowa Góra, Kamienica, Kletno, Młynowiec, Nowa Morawa, Nowy Gierałtów, Sienna, Stara Morawa, Stary Gierałtów, Strachocin, Stronie Wieś

Area
  - Total: 146.42 km^{2} (56.53 sq mi)

Population (2019-06-30)
  - Total: 7,539
  - Density: 51.49/km^{2} (133.4/sq mi)
- Website: http://www.stronie.pl/

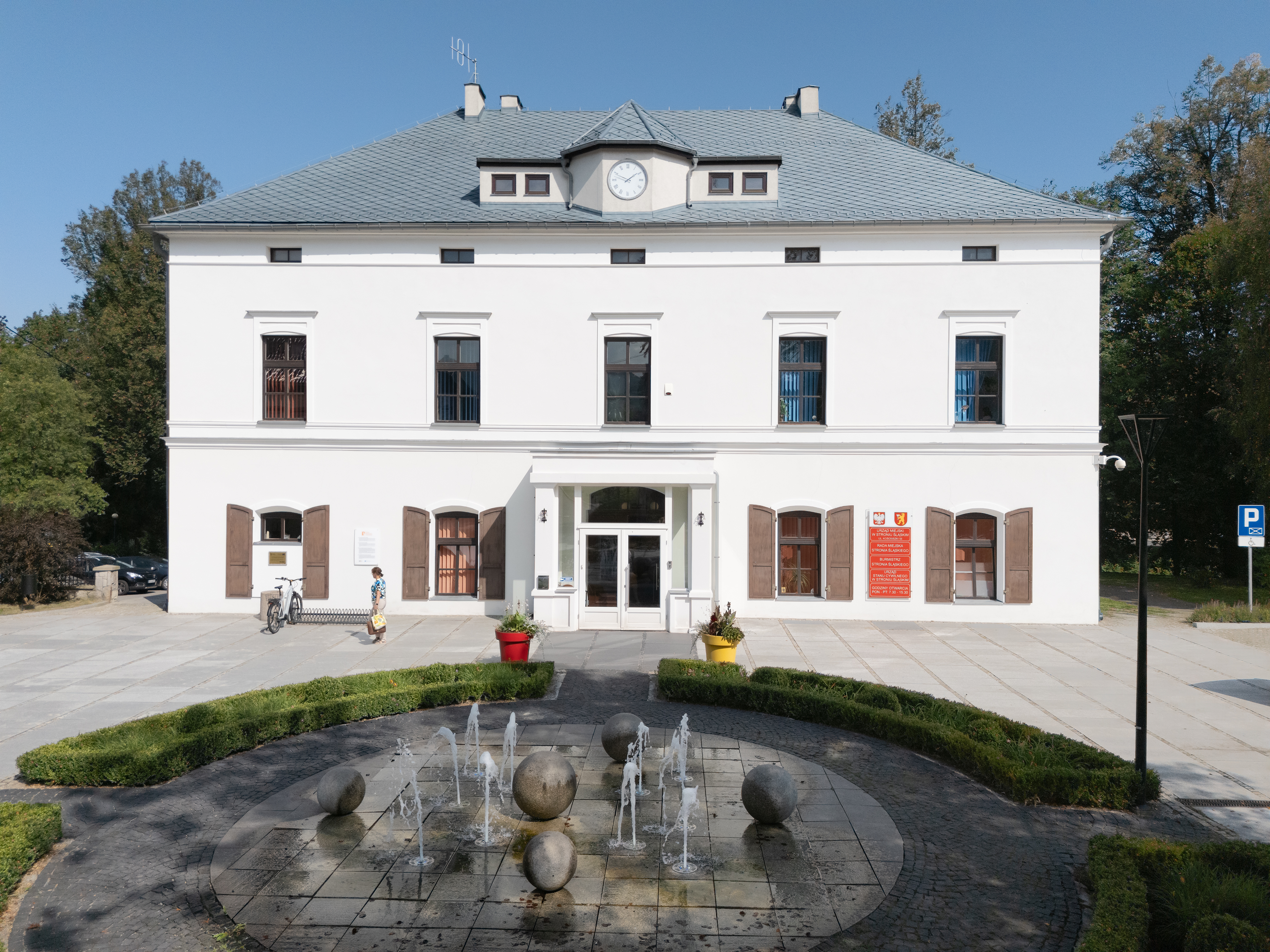

Gmina Stronie Śląskie is an urban-rural gmina (administrative district) in Kłodzko County, Lower Silesian Voivodeship, in south-western Poland, on the Czech border. Its seat is the town of Stronie Śląskie, which lies approximately 23 kilometres (14 mi) south-east of Kłodzko, and 93 kilometres (58 mi) south of the regional capital Wrocław.

The gmina covers an area of 146.42 square kilometres (56.5 sq mi), and as of 2019, its total population is 7,539.

== Neighbouring gminas ==
Gmina Stronie Śląskie is bordered by the gminas of Bystrzyca Kłodzka, Lądek-Zdrój and Międzylesie. It also borders the Czech Republic.

== Villages ==
Apart from the town of Stronie Śląskie, the gmina contains the villages of Bielice, Bolesławów, Goszów, Janowa Góra, Kamienica, Klecienko, Kletno, Młynowiec, Nowa Biela, Nowa Morawa, Nowy Gierałtów, Popków, Rogóżka, Sienna, Stara Morawa, Stary Gierałtów, Strachocin and Stronie Wieś.

== Twin towns – sister cities ==
Gmina Stronie Śląskie is twinned with:

- La Machine, France
- Staré Město, Czech Republic
- Dippoldiswalde, Germany
- Szikszó, Hungary
- Ustronie Morskie, Poland
- Chodzież, Poland

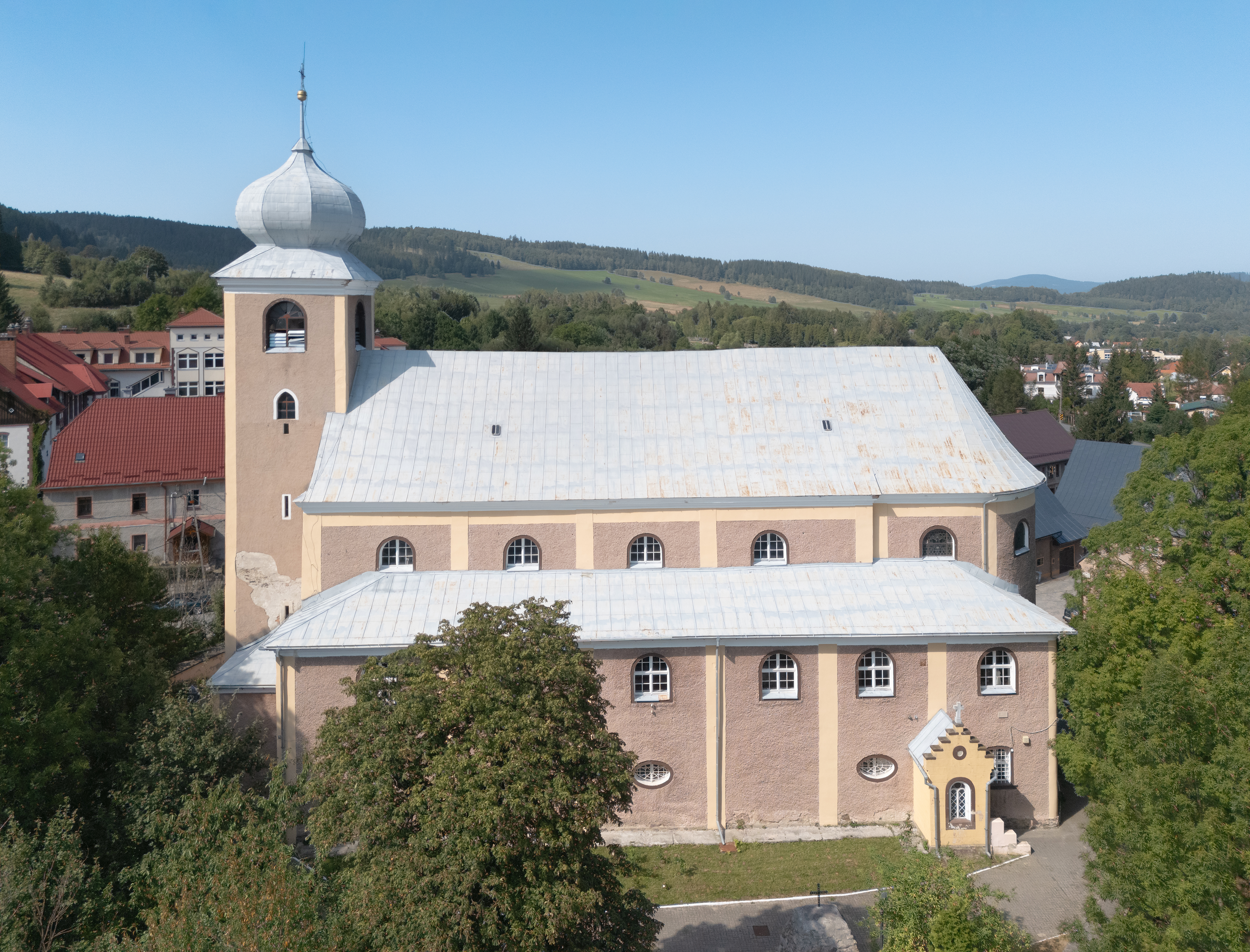
