= Bolesławów, Lower Silesian Voivodeship =

Bolesławów
- Village
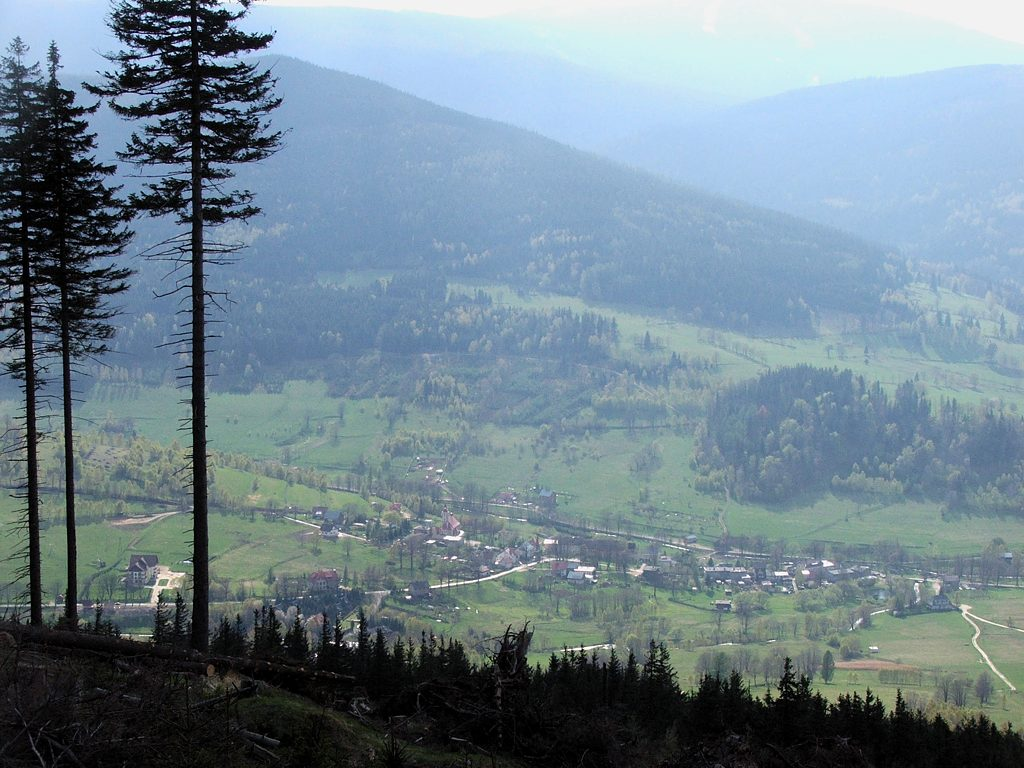
- Bolesławów seen from Suszyca mountain

- Coat of arms

- Location within Poland
- Coordinates: 50°15′25″N 16°53′33″E
- Country: Poland
- Voivodeship: Lower Silesia
- County: Kłodzko
- Gmina: Stronie Śląskie
- Elevation (max.): 595 m (1,952 ft)
- Population: 250
- Time zone: UTC+1 (CET)
  - Summer (DST): UTC+2 (CEST)
- Postal code: 57-550
- Area code: (+48) 74
- Vehicle registration: DKL

Bolesławów [bɔlɛˈswavuf] is a village (former town) in the administrative district of Gmina Stronie Śląskie, within Kłodzko County, Lower Silesian Voivodeship, in south-western Poland. It is located within the historic Kłodzko Land.

== History ==
It is a former town. It was granted town rights in 1581 and was deprived of them in 1894. In the 16th century the town became the center of a metal mining and industrial region. In the 17th century it became part of an estate, centered in Stronie Śląskie, which from 1838 was owned by Princess Marianne of the Netherlands. In the 18th century it was annexed by Prussia and from 1871 to 1945 it was part of Germany, and after the defeat of Nazi Germany in World War II it passed to Poland.

== Sights ==
Among the historic sights of Bolesławów are the Baroque church of St. Joseph and the statues of Catholic saints Francis Xavier and John of Nepomuk.

== Gallery ==
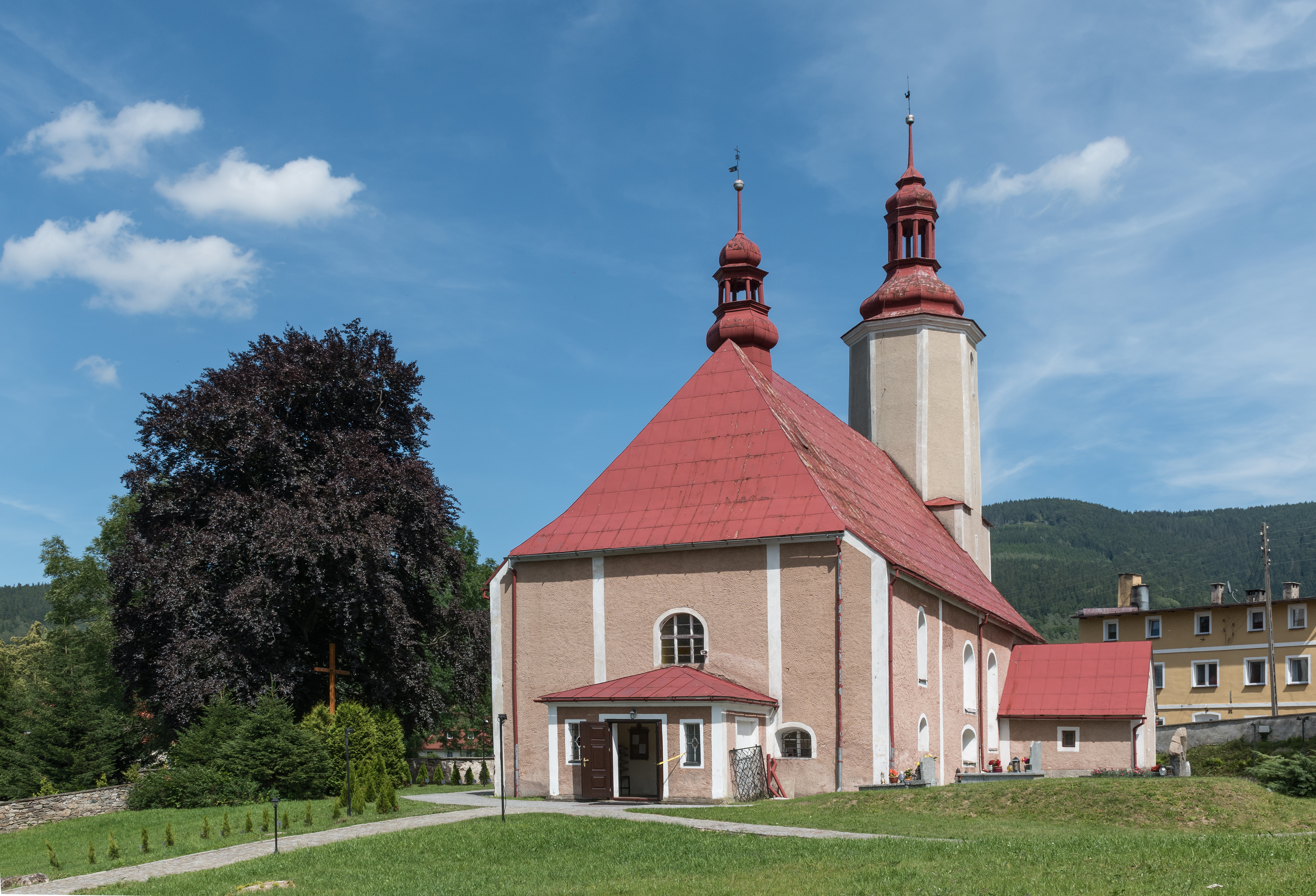
Saint Joseph's church

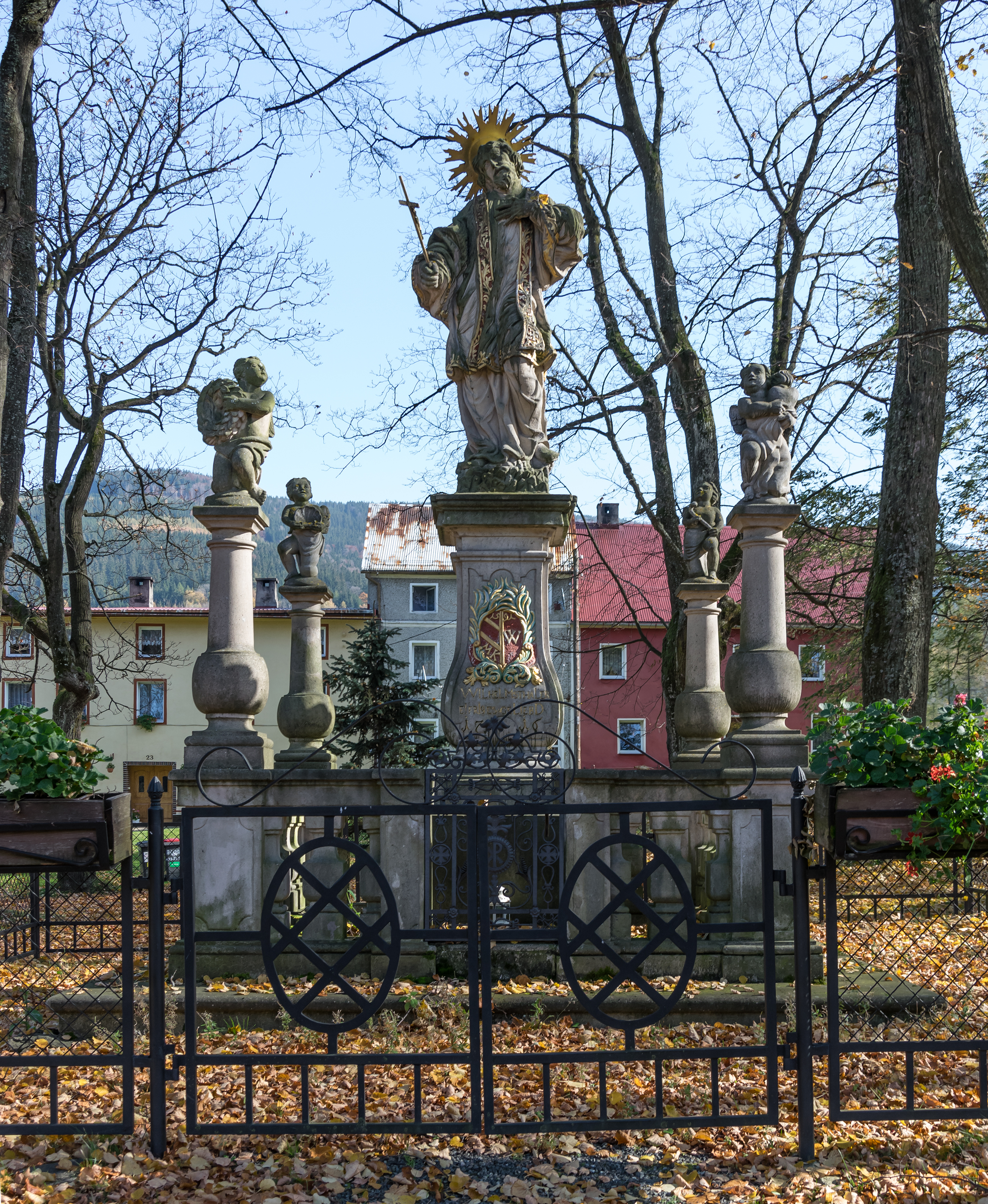
Statue of Saint Francis Xavier

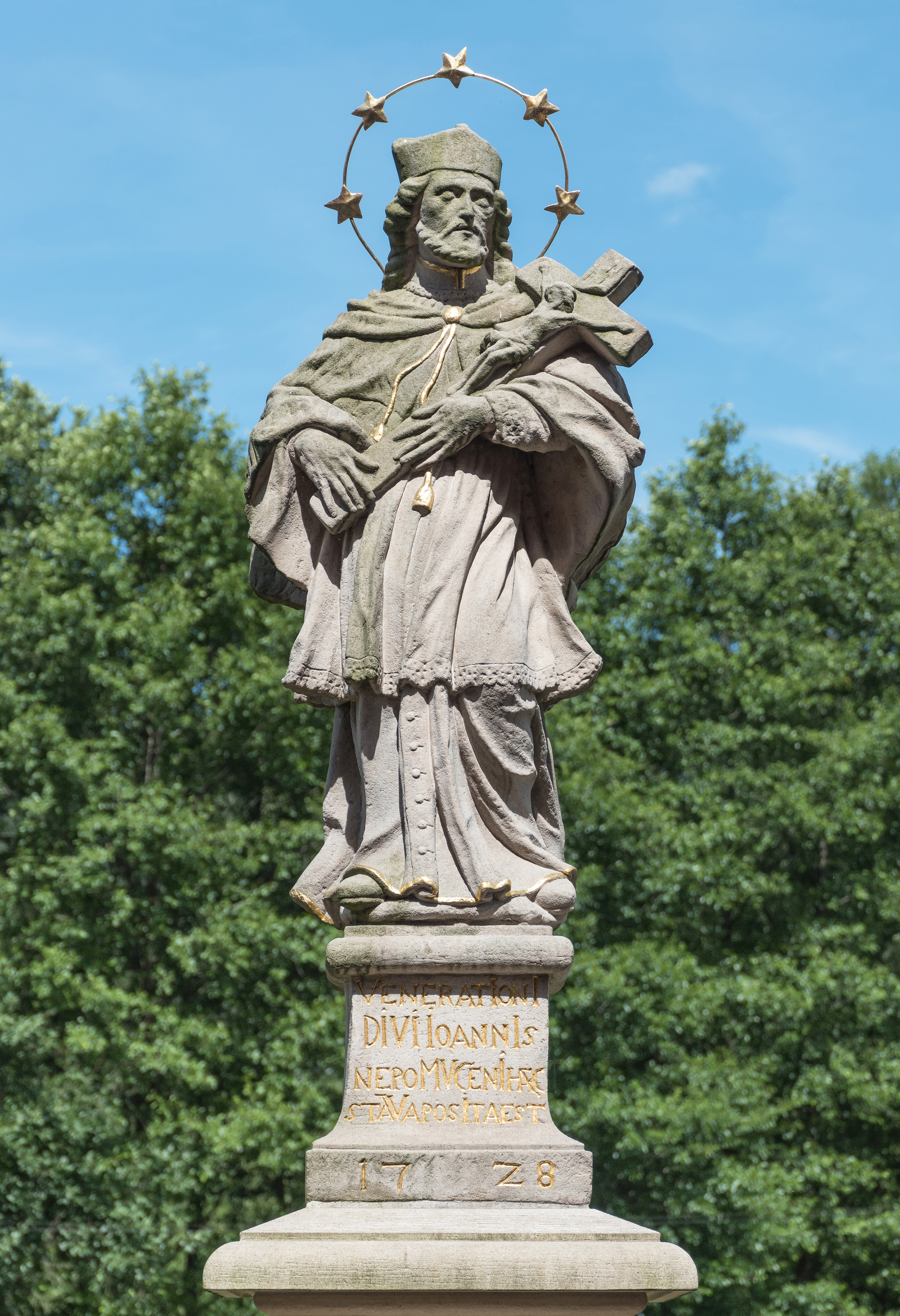
Statue of John of Nepomuk

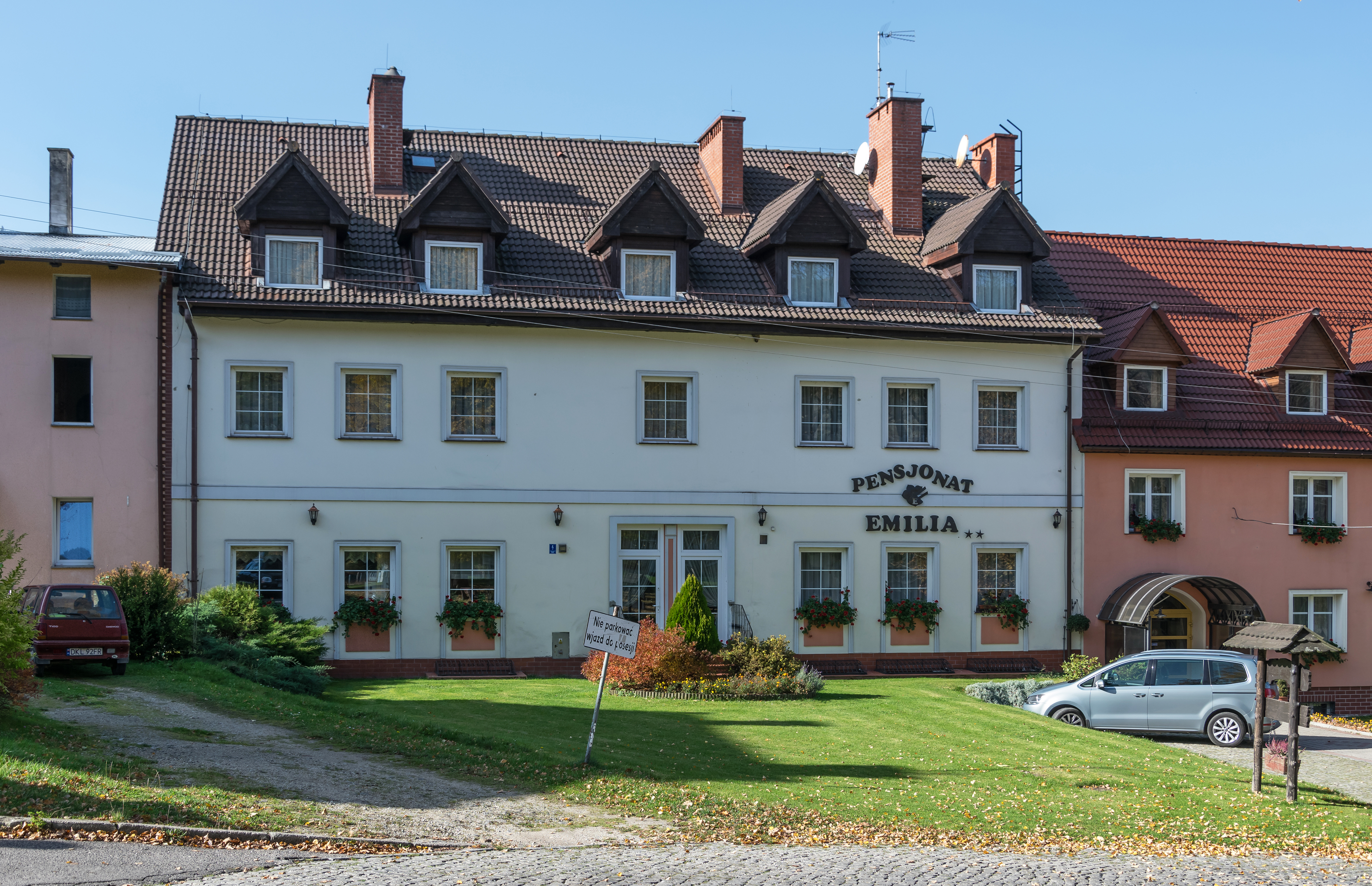
Pension Emilia

== Notable residents ==
- Wolfgang Vogel (1925–2008), German lawyer
