= Klecienko =

- Village
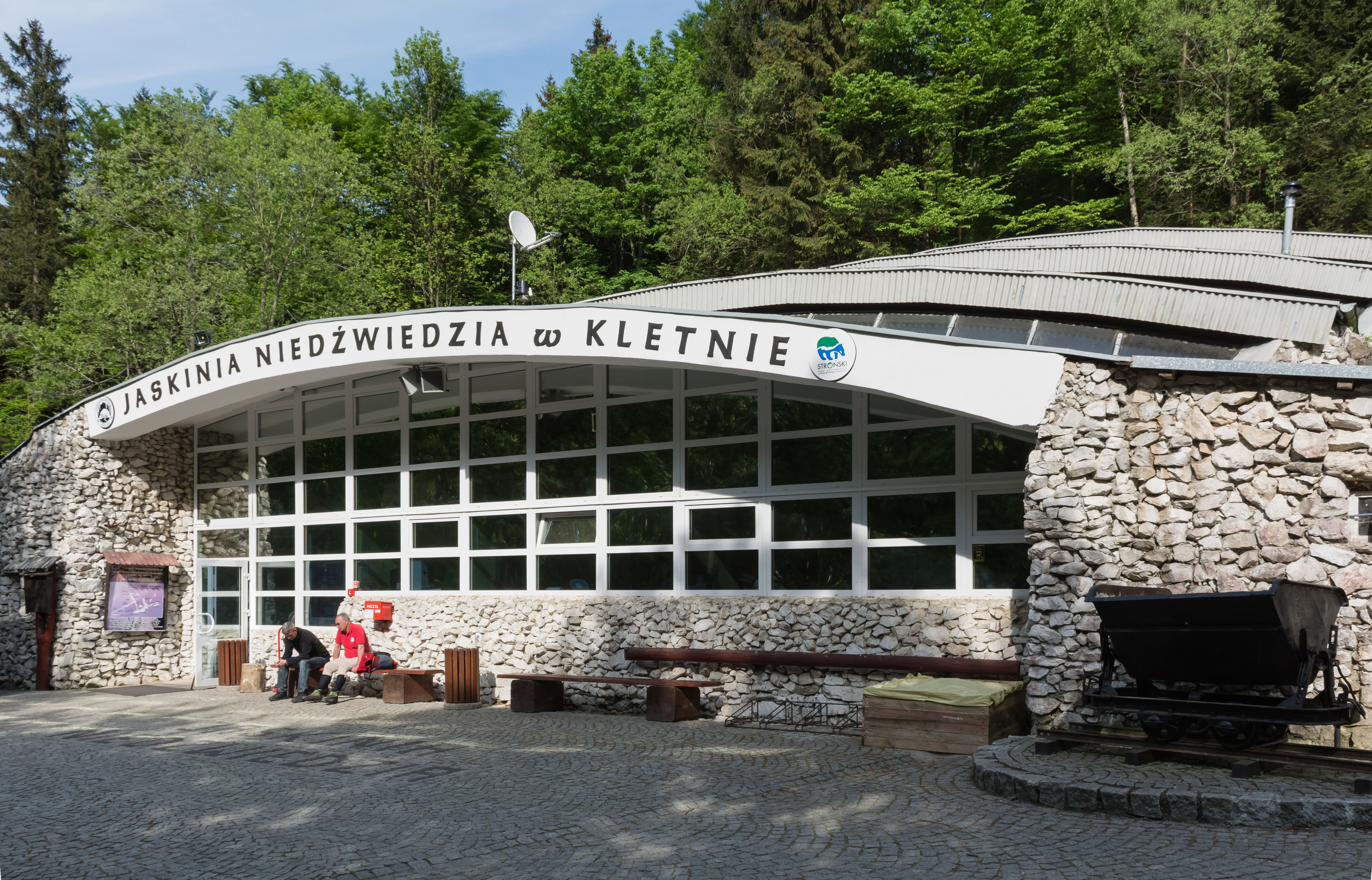

- Location within Poland
- Coordinates: 50°14′27″N 16°51′05″E
- Country: Poland
- Voivodeship: Lower Silesian
- County: Kłodzko
- Gmina: Stronie Śląskie
- Website: http://www.kletno.info.pl/

Klecienko [klɛˈt͡ɕɛnkɔ] is a village in the administrative district of Gmina Stronie Śląskie, within Kłodzko County, Lower Silesian Voivodeship, in south-western Poland.
