= Nowa Morawa =

- Village
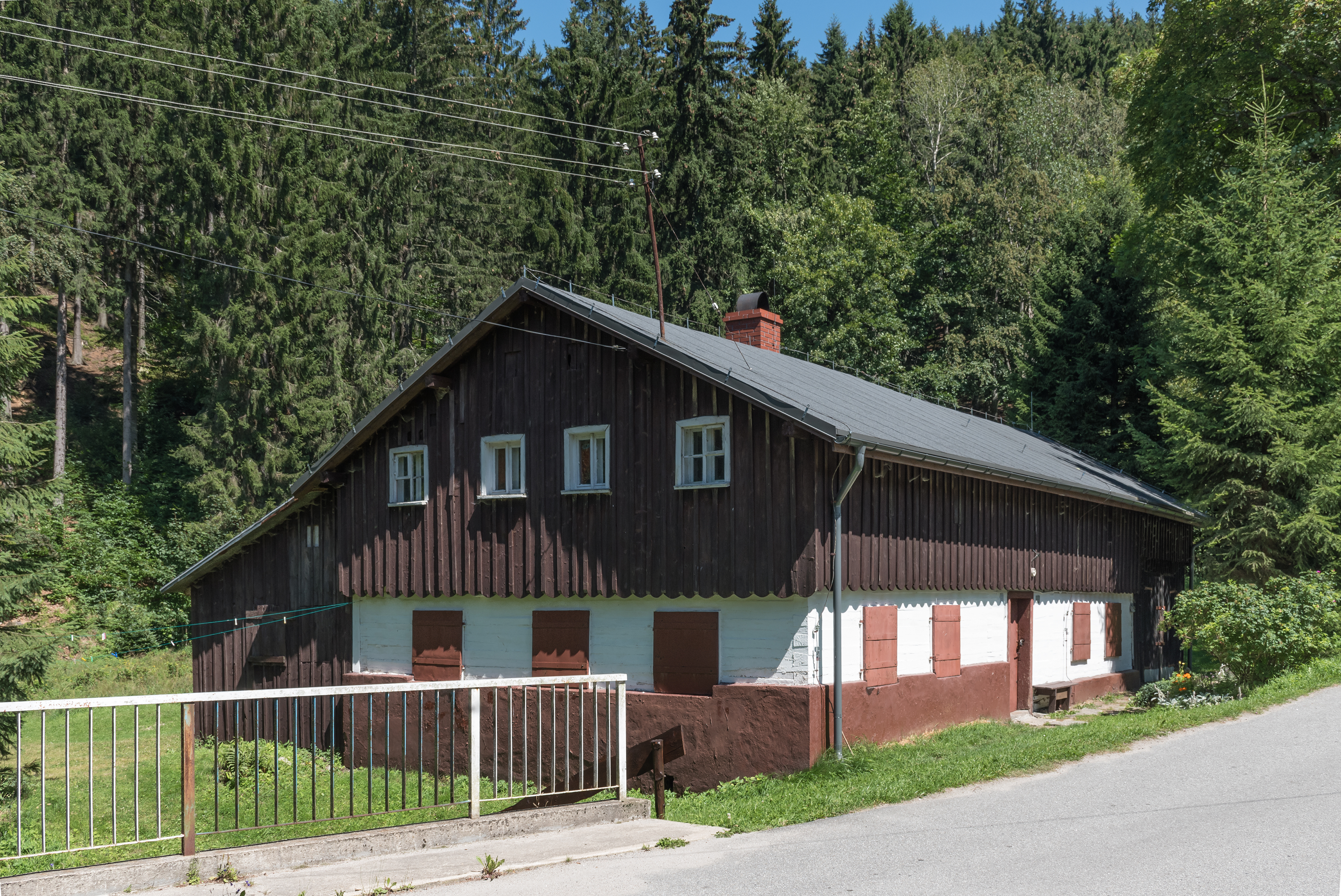

- Location within Poland
- Coordinates: 50°14′18″N 16°54′19″E
- Country: Poland
- Voivodeship: Lower Silesian
- County: Kłodzko
- Gmina: Stronie Śląskie
- Elevation (max.): 700 m (2,300 ft)

Population
  - Total: 40

Nowa Morawa [ˈnɔva mɔˈrava] is a village in the administrative district of Gmina Stronie Śląskie, within Kłodzko County, Lower Silesian Voivodeship, in south-western Poland.
