= Stara Morawa =

- Village
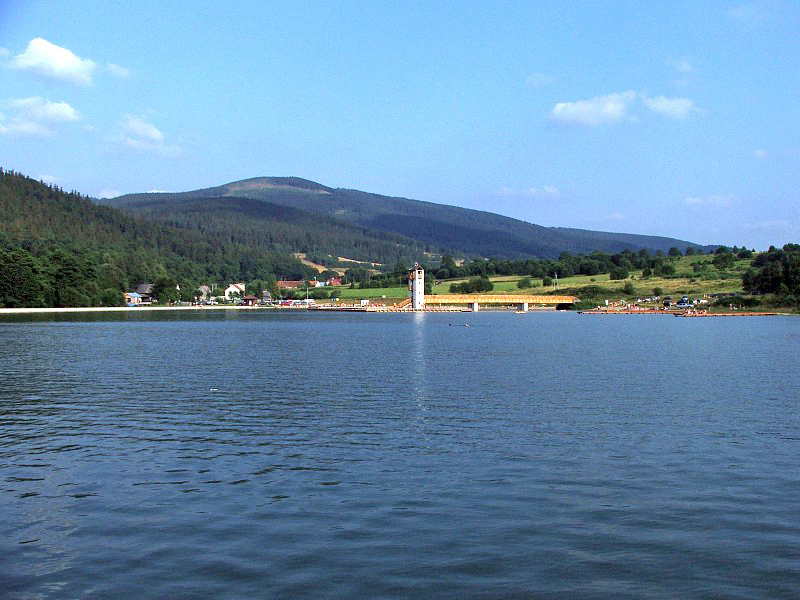
- Reservoir near Stara Morawa

- Location within Poland
- Coordinates: 50°17′N 16°53′E
- Country: Poland
- Voivodeship: Lower Silesian
- County: Kłodzko
- Gmina: Stronie Śląskie
- Highest elevation: 570 m (1,870 ft)

Population
  - Total: 110
- Time zone: UTC+1 (CET)
  - Summer (DST): UTC+2 (CEST)

Stara Morawa [ˈstara mɔˈrava] is a village in the administrative district of Gmina Stronie Śląskie, within Kłodzko County, Lower Silesian Voivodeship, in south-western Poland. In 1975–1998 it belonged to Wałbrzych Voivodeship.

A reservoir near Stara Morawa was constructed between 2000 and 2006.

== Lime Kiln Grace Stone ==
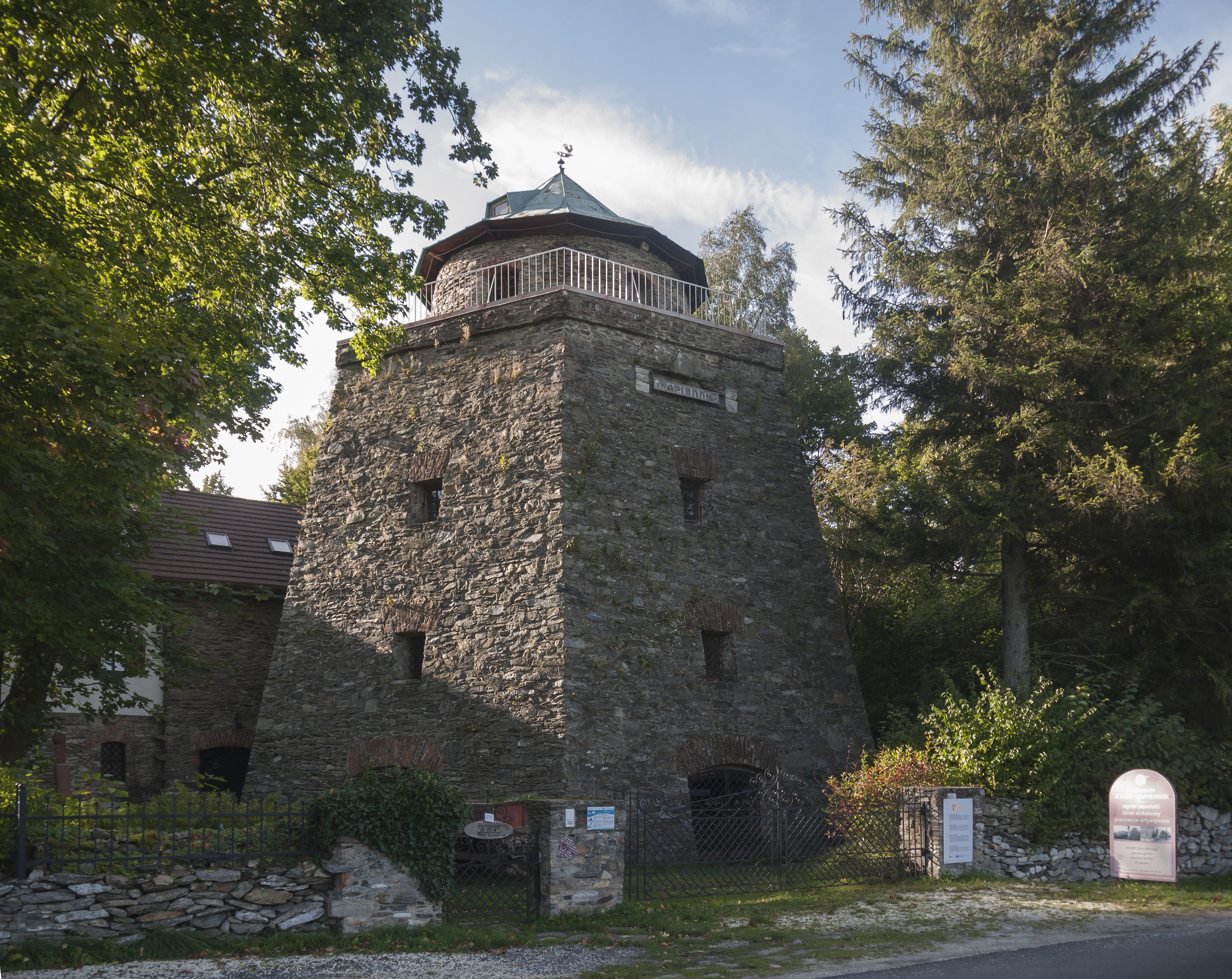
Old lime kiln

Above the village, on the road to Kletno, there is an old lime kiln which has been classified as a cultural monument. The building was designed in the early 19th century by Karl Friedrich Schinkel. It was restored in 1978 by the family of Prof. Jacek Rybczyński and is the seat of the German-Polish Booster Club Lime Kiln Grace Stone, the Museum Lime Kiln, and the editorial office of the regional historical journal Stronica Śnieżnika. In the adjacent park there is an art gallery.
