= Stary Gierałtów =

- Village
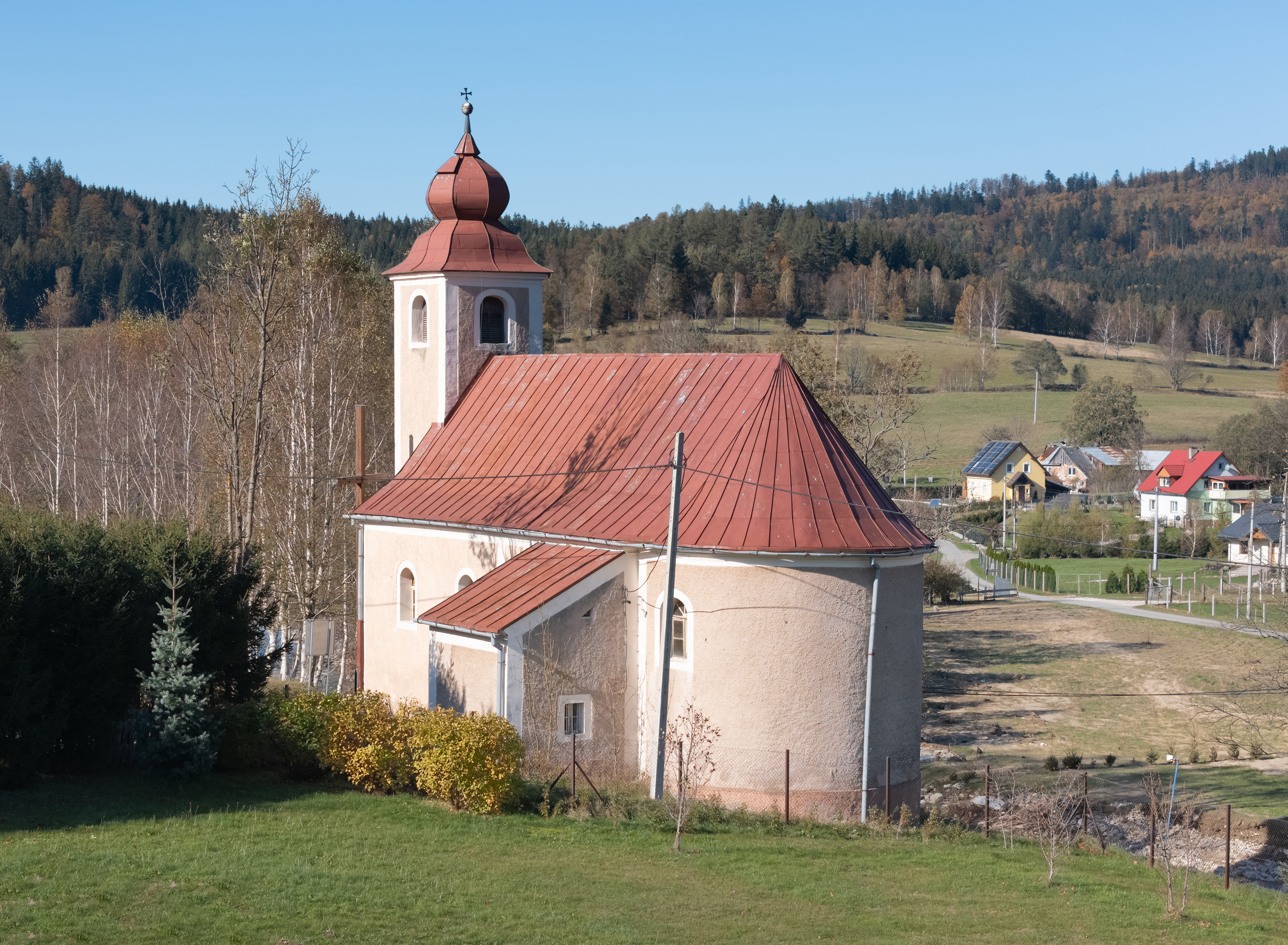

- Location within Poland
- Coordinates: 50°18′31″N 16°55′50″E
- Country: Poland
- Voivodeship: Lower Silesian
- County: Kłodzko
- Gmina: Stronie Śląskie
- Highest elevation: 600 m (2,000 ft)

Population
  - Total: 320

Stary Gierałtów [ˈstarɨ ɡʲɛˈrau̯tuf] is a village in the administrative district of Gmina Stronie Śląskie, within Kłodzko County, Lower Silesian Voivodeship, in south-western Poland, near the border with the Czech Republic.
