= Popków =

- Village
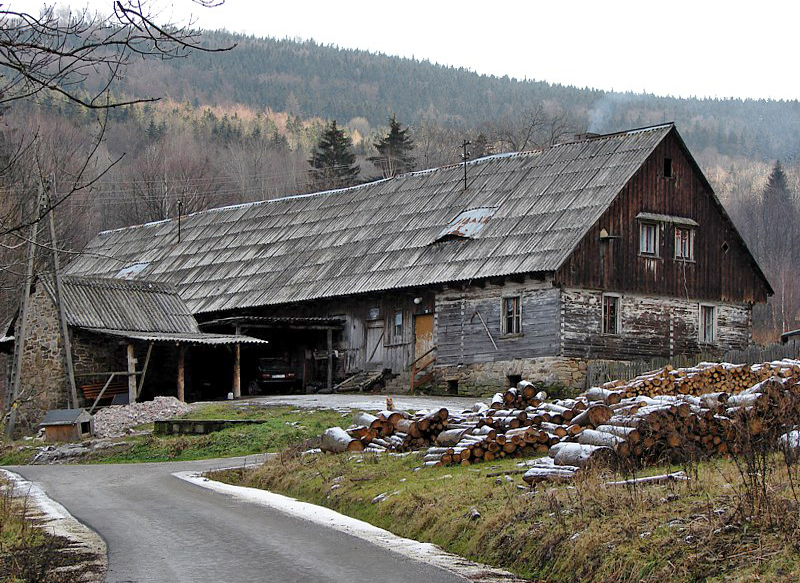

- Location within Poland
- Coordinates: 50°17′52″N 16°55′12″E
- Country: Poland
- Voivodeship: Lower Silesian
- County: Kłodzko
- Gmina: Stronie Śląskie

Popków [ˈpɔpkuf] is a village in the administrative district of Gmina Stronie Śląskie, within Kłodzko County, Lower Silesian Voivodeship, in south-western Poland.
