= Stronie Wieś =

- Village
- Location within Poland
- Coordinates: 50°17′12″N 16°51′45″E
- Country: Poland
- Voivodeship: Lower Silesian
- County: Kłodzko
- Gmina: Stronie Śląskie

Stronie Wieś [ˈstrɔɲɛ ˈvjɛɕ] is a village in the administrative district of Gmina Stronie Śląskie, within Kłodzko County, Lower Silesian Voivodeship, in south-western Poland.

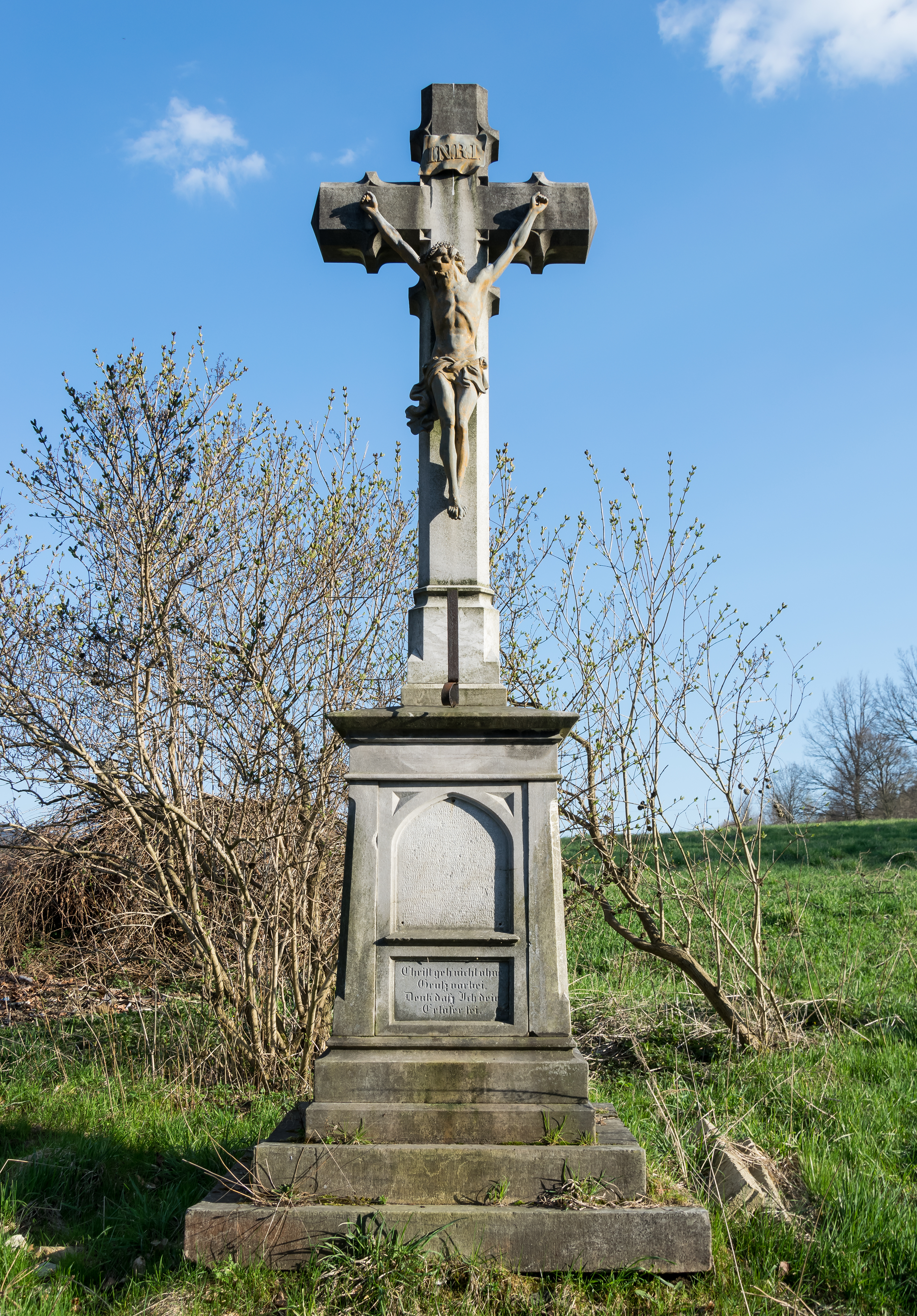
