= Strachocin, Lower Silesian Voivodeship =

Strachocin
- Village
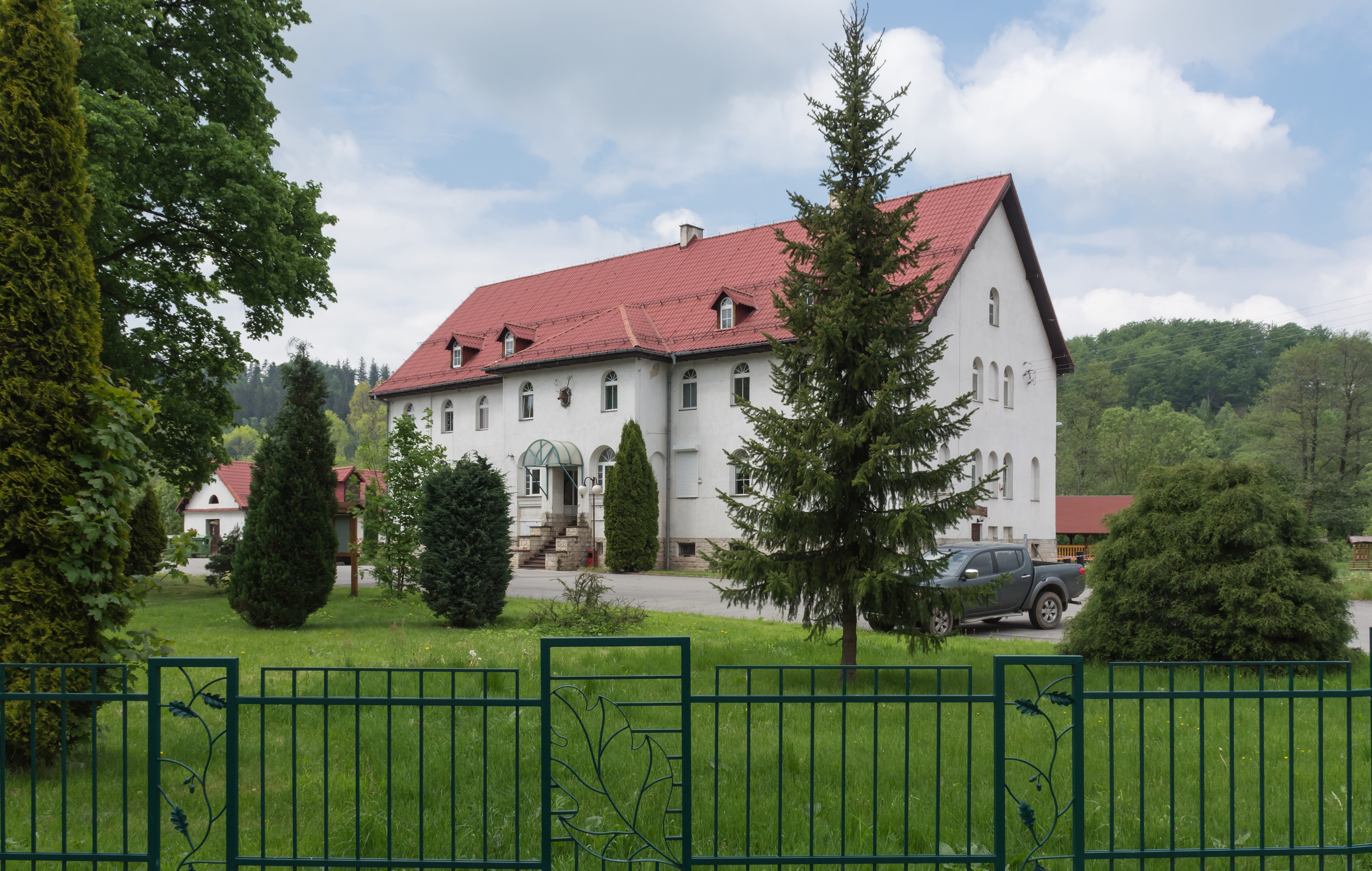

- Location within Poland
- Coordinates: 50°18′29″N 16°52′32″E
- Country: Poland
- Voivodeship: Lower Silesian
- County: Kłodzko
- Gmina: Stronie Śląskie

Strachocin [straˈxɔt͡ɕin] is a village in the administrative district of Gmina Stronie Śląskie, within Kłodzko County, Lower Silesian Voivodeship, in south-western Poland.
