= Kletno =

- Village
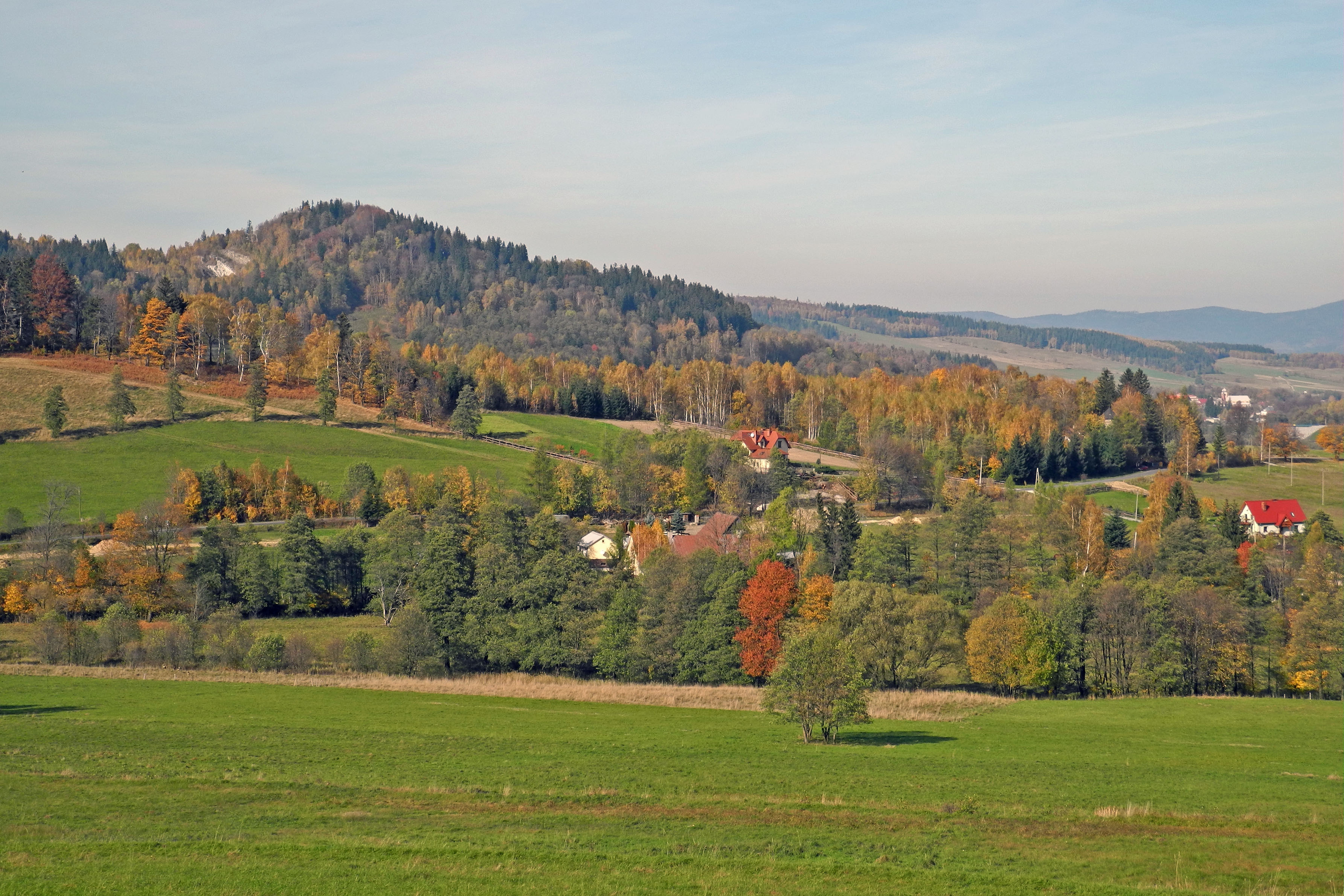
- Kletno with the Krzyżnik mountain in the background

- Location within Poland
- Coordinates: 50°15′38″N 17°01′54″E
- Country: Poland
- Voivodeship: Lower Silesian
- County: Kłodzko
- Gmina: Stronie Śląskie
- Elevation (max.): 720 m (2,360 ft)
- Time zone: UTC+1 (CET)
  - Summer (DST): UTC+2 (CEST)
- Website: http://www.kletno.info.pl/

Kletno [ˈklɛtnɔ] is a village in the administrative district of Gmina Stronie Śląskie, within Kłodzko County, Lower Silesian Voivodeship, in south-western Poland.

The village was founded at the end of the 16th century as Klessengrund, when the region was part of the Kingdom of Bohemia.

Among the attractions of Kletno are the Jaskinia Niedźwiedzia (Bear Cave), a museum dedicated to minerals and fossils (Muzeum Ziemi) and the former uranium mine.

== Gallery ==
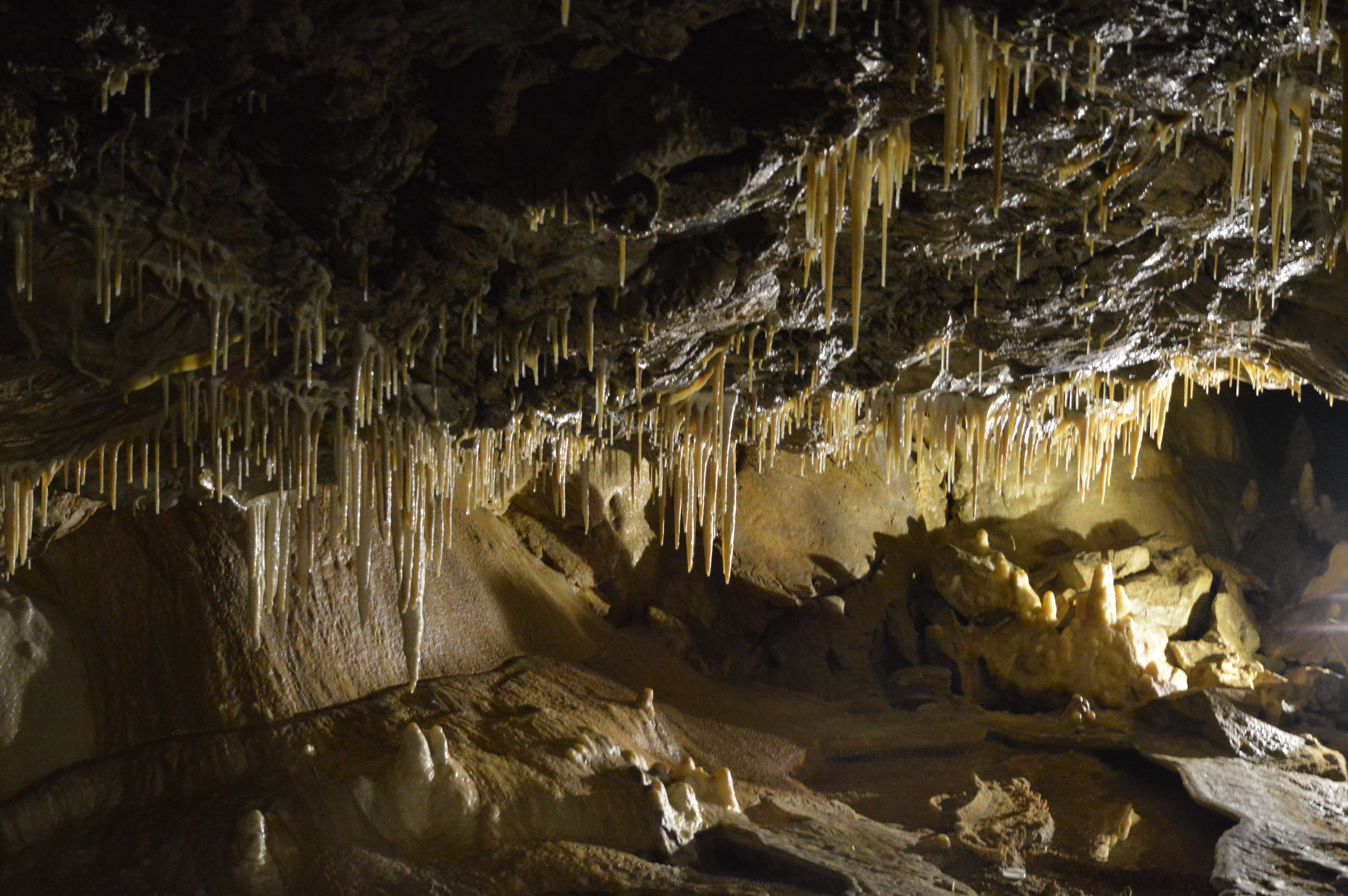
Jaskinia Niedźwiedzia (Bear Cave)

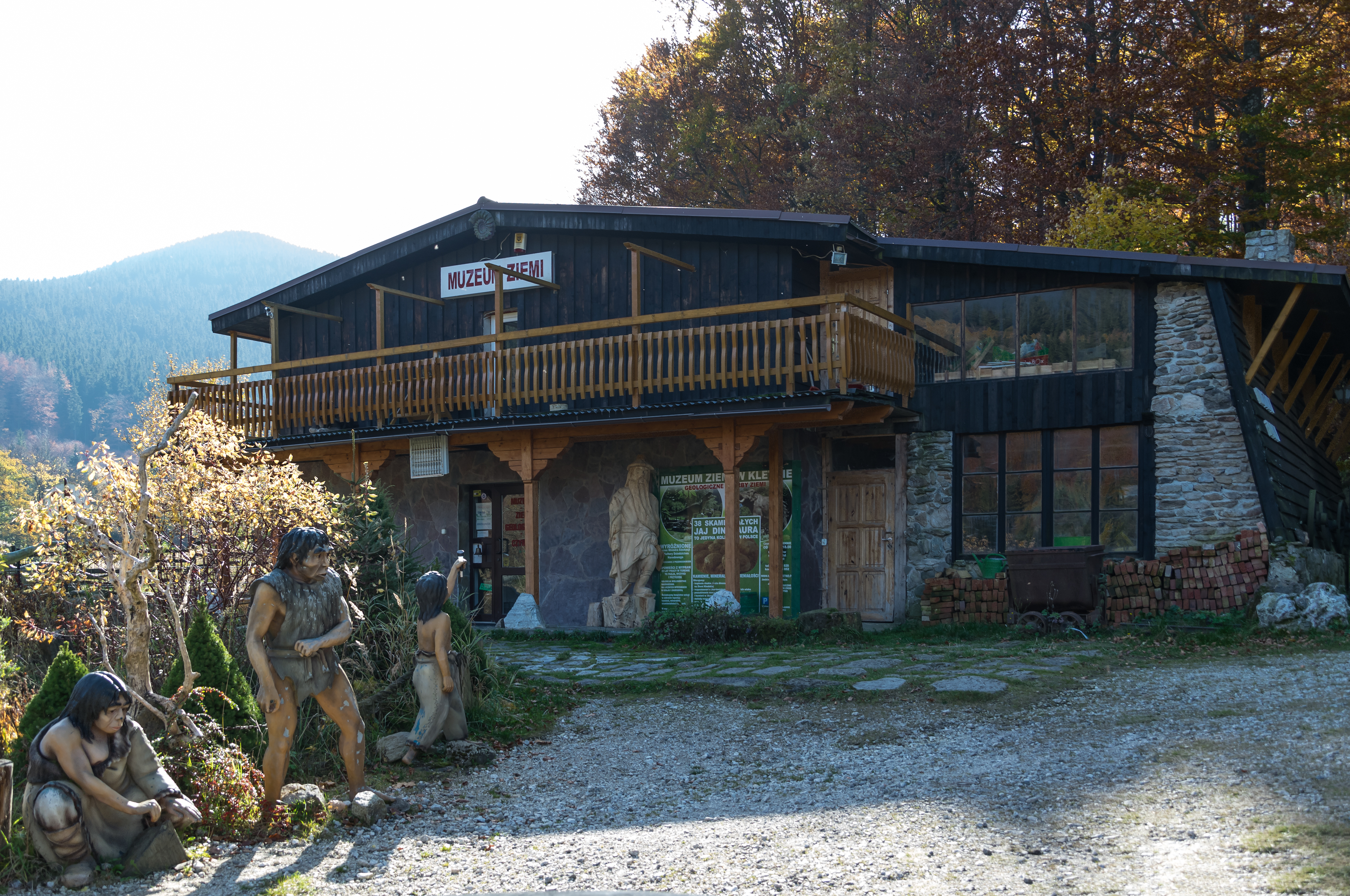
Muzeum Ziemi

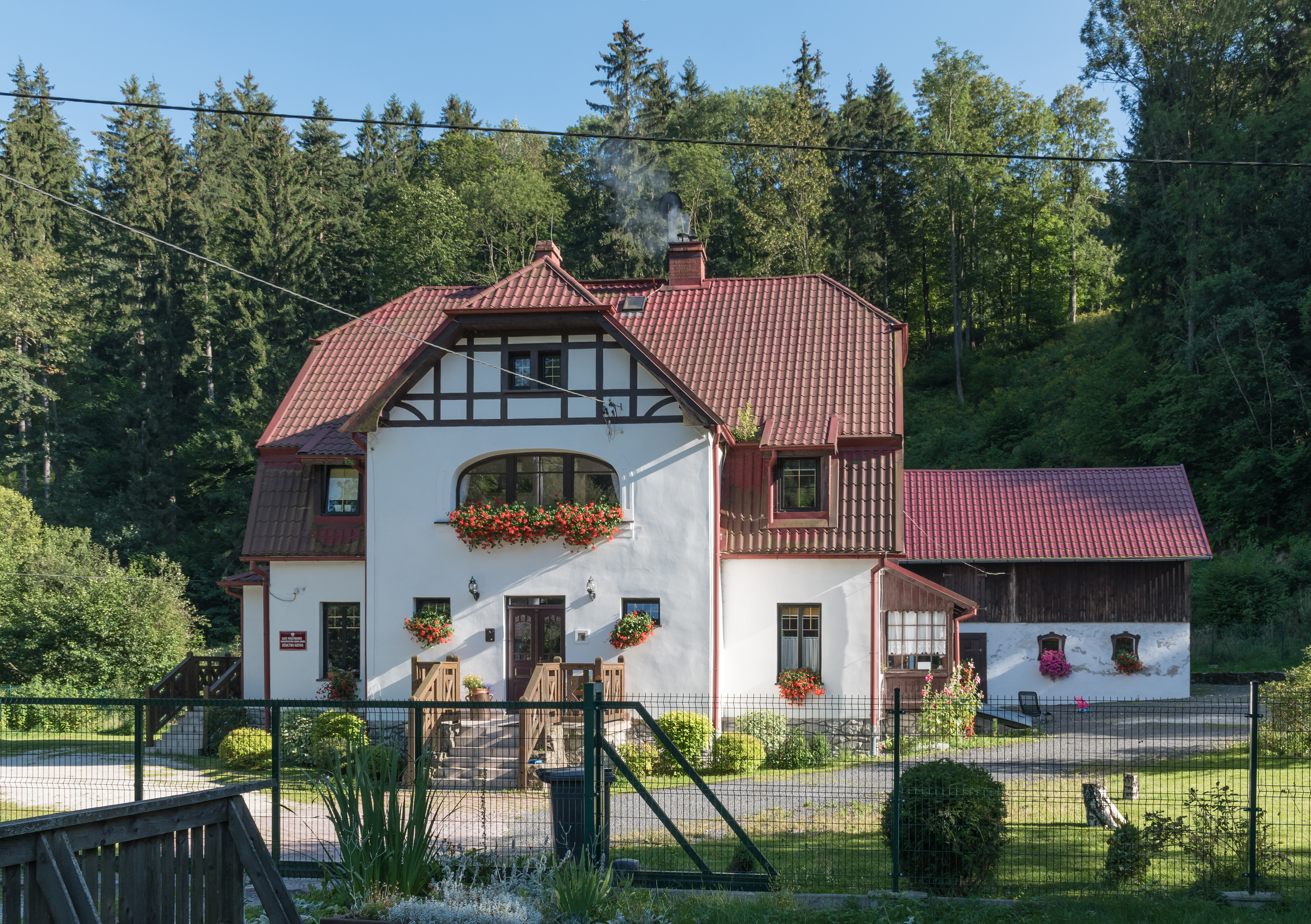
Forester's lodge

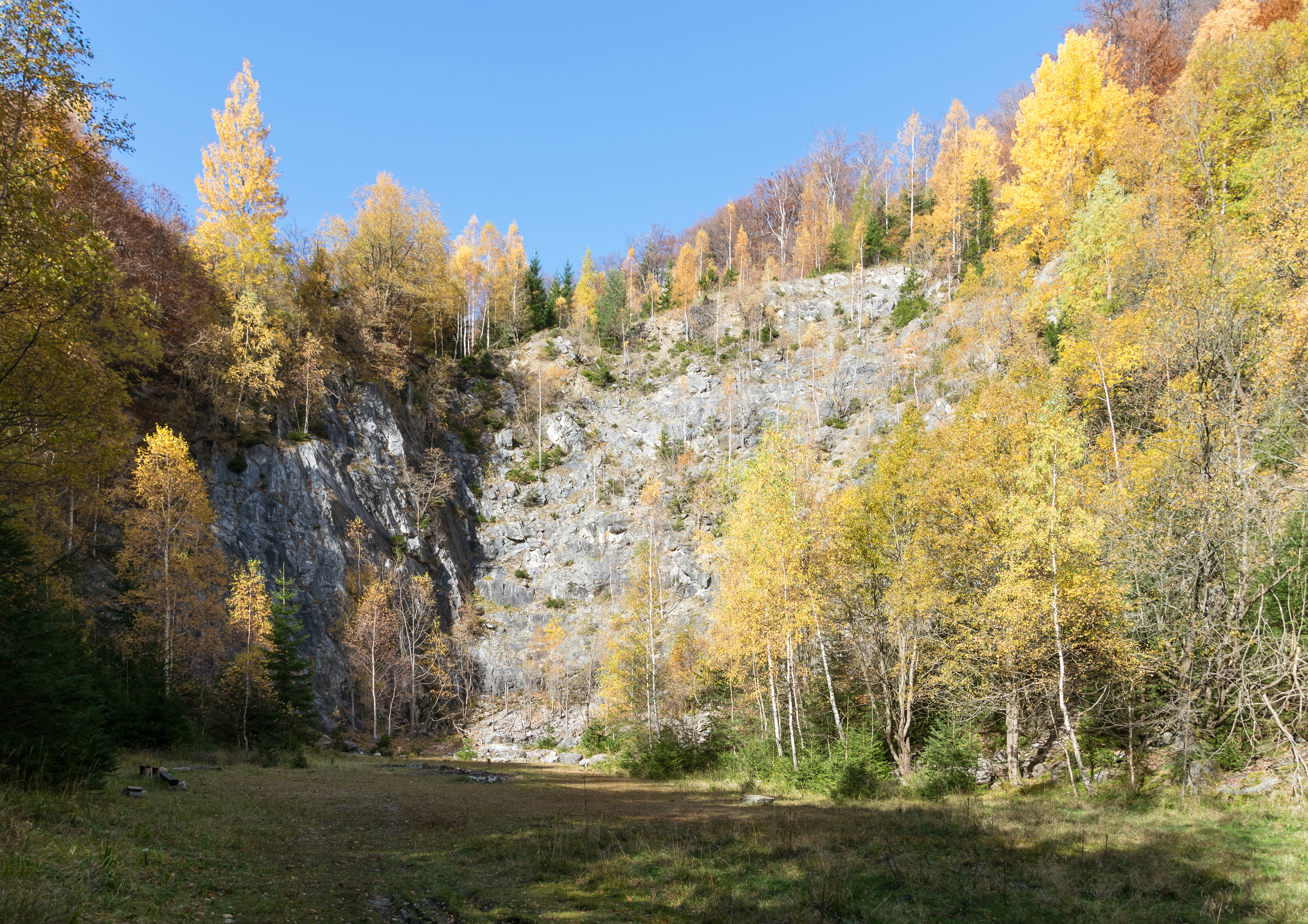
Quarries in Kletno
