= List of caves of Poland =

This article is about the caves of Poland.

== Geographic distribution ==
=== Tatra Mountains ===
As of 2018, there are 843 caves known in the Polish Tatra Mountains with the total length exceeding 134 km. They are within Tatra National Park. All the prominent ones are limestone karst caves of the Western Tatras, but there are also some tectonic caves. The largest and deepest caves of the Tatras (and of Poland) are located in the Czerwone Wierchy and Kominiarski Wierch massifs. Another highly promising region, the massif of Giewont, is largely unexplored due to its strict nature conservation status.

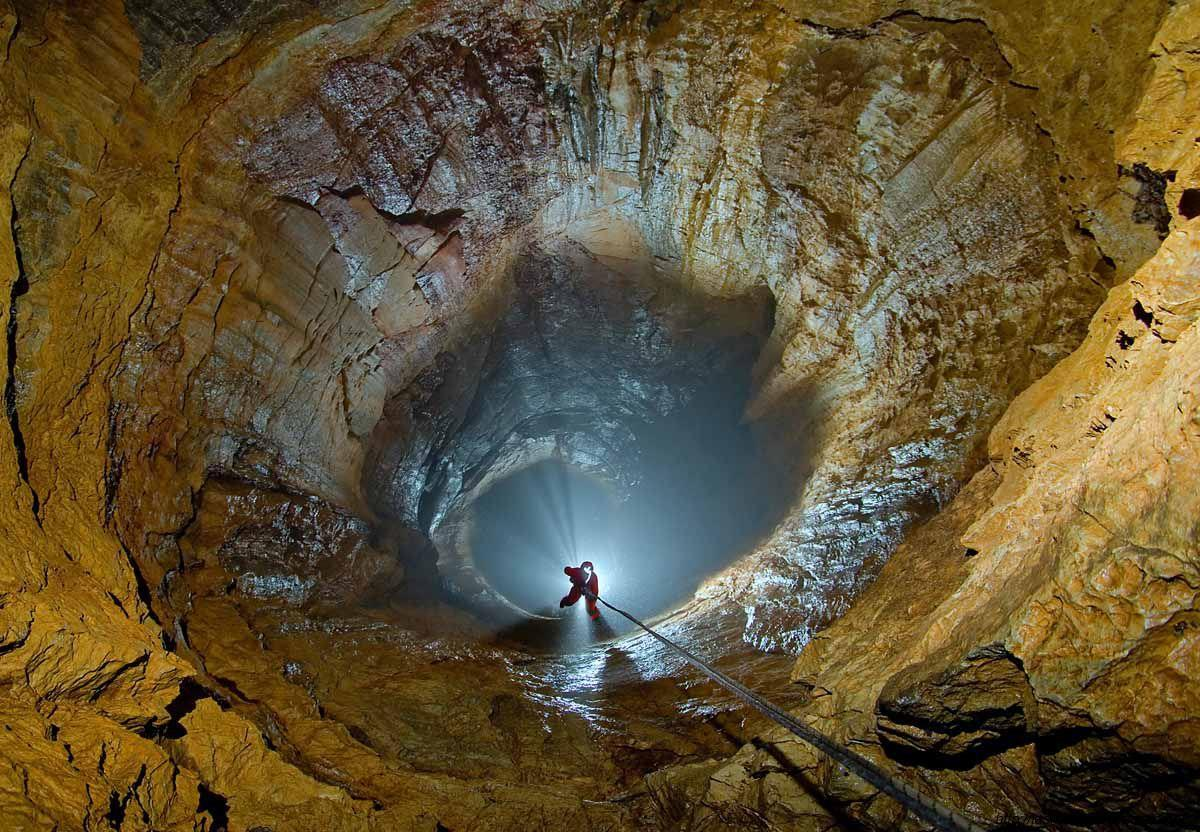
Jaskinia Wielka Śnieżna

- Bańdzioch Kominiarski
- Bliźniacza Studnia
- Dudnica
- Dudowa Studnia
- Dziura
- Dziura Wyżnia – Jaskinia Lisia
- Dziurka w Trawce
- Górne Kominy
- Jasiowa Dziura
- Jaskinia Bystrej
- Jaskinia Czarna
- Jaskinia Goryczkowa
- Jaskinia Kalacka
- Jaskinia Kamienne Mleko
- Jaskinia Kasprowa Niżnia
- Jaskinia Kasprowa Średnia
- Jaskinia Kasprowa Wyżnia
- Jaskinia Kozia
- Jaskinia Lejbusiowa
- Jaskinia Lodowa Małołącka
- Jaskinia Lodowa Miętusia
- Jaskinia Lodowa Mułowa
- Jaskinia Lodowa w Ciemniaku
- Jaskinia Lodowa w Twardych Spadach
- Jaskinia Magurska
- Jaskinia Mała w Mułowej
- Jaskinia Małołącka
- Jaskinia Marmurowa
- Jaskinia Miętusia
- Jaskinia Miętusia Wyżnia
- Jaskinia Mroźna
- Jaskinia Mylna
- Jaskinia Naciekowa
- Jaskinia nad Zagonem
- Jaskinia Obłazkowa
- Jaskinia pod Dachem
- Jaskinia pod Okapem
- Jaskinia pod Wantą (Litworowy Dzwon)
- Jaskinia Poszukiwaczy Skarbów
- Jaskinia Przeziorowa
- Jaskinia przy Przechodzie
- Jaskinia Psia
- Jaskinia Raptawicka
- Jaskinia Śpiących Rycerzy
- Jaskinia Śpiących Rycerzy Wyżnia
- Jaskinia w Czubie Jaworzyńskiej
- Jaskinia Wielka Śnieżna — longest, largest, and deepest cave in Poland
- Jaskinia Wodna pod Pisaną
- Jaskinia Wodna pod Raptawicką
- Jaskinia Wysoka – Jaskinia za Siedmiu Progami
- Jaskinia Wyżnia Litworowa
- Jaskinia za Płytą (Dziura z Kośćmi Kozicy)
- Jaskinia Zakosista
- Jaskinia Zimna
- Jaskinia Zośka – Zagonna Studnia
- Jędrusiowa Dziura
- Komin w Kazalnicy
- Komin w Ratuszu
- Koprowa Studnia
- Mnichowa Studnia Wyżnia
- Niebieska Studnia
- Piwnica Miętusia
- Piwniczka
- Pomarańczarnia
- Ptasia Studnia
- Śnieżna Studnia
- Studnia w Dziurawem
- Studnia w Kazalnicy
- Studnia w Progu Mułowym
- Studnia za Murem
- Szara Studnia
- Szczelina Chochołowska
- Tunel Małołącki
- Tylkowa Szczelina
- Zielone Kominy

=== Pieniny ===
- Jaskinia nad Polaną Sosnówką
- Jaskinia Pienińska
- Jaskinia w Ociemnem
- Jaskinia Wyżna
- Jaskinia w Obłazowej

=== Jura ===
In the area of Kraków-Częstochowa Upland there are over 1800 known limestone caves, most of them shorter than 100m and rather shallow.

- Tunel Wielki, an archaeological site.

=== Sudetes ===
- Aven w Połomie, Wojcieszów
- Jaskinia Biały Kamień
- Jaskinia Błotna, Wojcieszów
- Jaskinia Imieninowa, Nowe Rochowice
- Jaskinia Kontaktowa, Stara Morawa
- Jaskinia Kryształowa, Wojcieszów (destroyed)
- Jaskinia na Ścianie, Rogóżka
- Jaskinia Niedźwiedzia, Kletno
- Jaskinia Nowa, Wojcieszów
- Jaskinia Pajęcza, Wojcieszów
- Jaskinia Północna Duża, Wojcieszów
- Jaskinia Radochowska, Radochów
- Jaskinia z Filarami – Jaskinia Prosta, Kochanów
- Jaskinia z Rondami, Kochanów
- Szczelina Wojcieszowska, Wojcieszów
- Złota Sztolnia, Duszniki-Zdrój

=== Świętokrzyskie ===
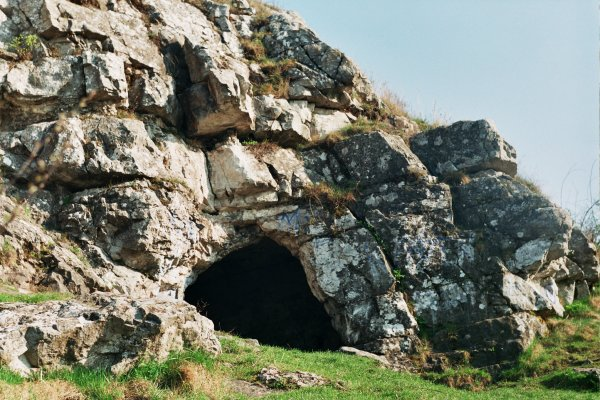
Jaskinia Zbójecka

- Chelosiowa Jama – Jaskinia Jaworznicka, Jaworznia
- Jaskinia Pajęcza, Jaworznia
- Paradise Cave, Dobrzączka
- Jaskinia Zbójecka, Łagów
- Prochownia, Jaskinia Odkrywców, Kielce
- Szczelina na Kadzielni, Kielce

=== Nida Basin ===
Gypsum karst caves of the Nida syncline.

- Jaskinia Sawickiego, Bronina
- Jaskinia Skorocicka, Skorocice
- Jaskinia u Ujścia Doliny, Skorocice
- Jaskinia w Aleksandrowie, Aleksandrów
- Jaskinia w Gackach, Gacki

=== Gdańsk Pomerania ===
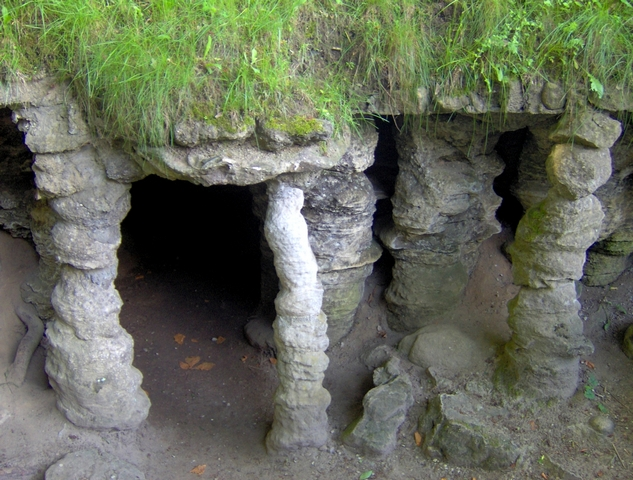
Jaskinia w Mechowie

- Grota Mirachowska I (Schron z Kolumnami), Mirachowo
- Grota Mirachowska II (Schronisko Owalne), Mirachowo
- Jaskinia Bajka I, Gądecz
- Jaskinia Bajka II, Gądecz
- Jaskinia Goryla, Gdynia
- Jaskinia Klonowa, Grudziądz
- Jaskinia pod Wierzbą, Grudziądz
- Jaskinia Śpiącego Szweda, Gdynia
- Jaskinia w Mechowie, Mechowo
- Schronisko w Połchowie, Połchowo

== Tourist caves ==
There are currently 17 tourist caves in Poland.

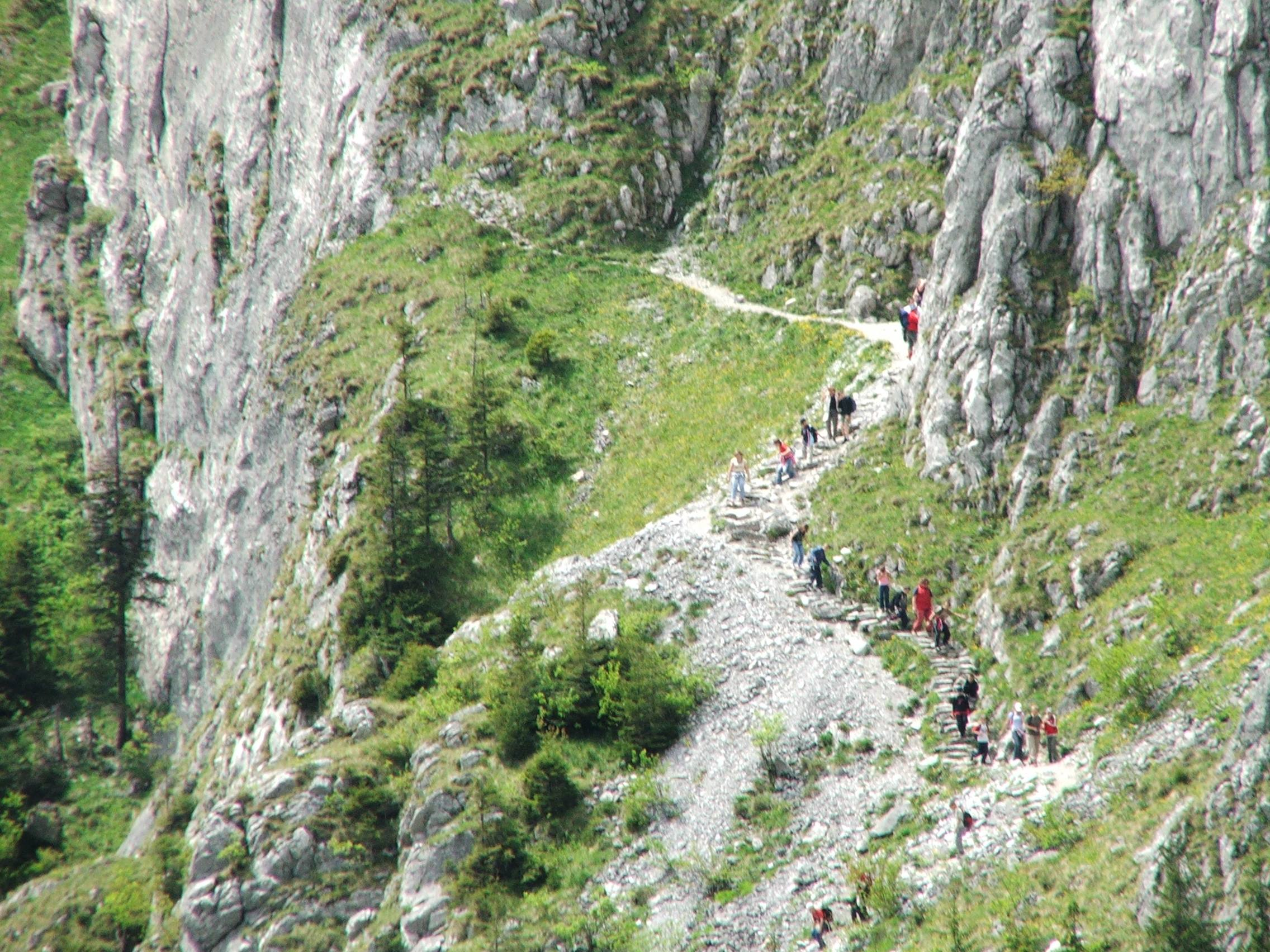
Trail to Jaskinia Obłazkowa and Jaskinia Mylna

=== Show caves ===
Show caves, with guided tours and requiring an entrance fee:

- Jaskinia Ciemna, Ojców National Park
- Jaskinia Dziurawy Kamień, Sudetes
- Jaskinia Łokietka, Ojców National Park
- Jaskinia Mroźna, Western Tatras
- Jaskinia Niedźwiedzia, Sudetes
- Jaskinia Nietoperzowa, Polish Jura Chain
- Jaskinia Radochowska, Sudetes
- Jaskinia Raj, Świętokrzyskie
- Jaskinia w Mechowie, Gdańsk Pomerania
- Jaskinia Wierzchowska Górna, Polish Jura
- Smocza Jama, Kraków

=== Other ===
Other caves made accessible to the general public as part of a tourist trail:

- Dziura, Western Tatras
- Jaskinia Malinowska, Silesian Beskids
- Jaskinia Mylna, Western Tatras
- Jaskinia Obłazkowa, Western Tatras
- Jaskinia Raptawicka, Western Tatras
- Smocza Jama, Western Tatras

== Records ==
- The largest and deepest cave:
  Jaskinia Wielka Śnieżna in the Western Tatras, with the length of 23.723 km and vertical range of 824 m
- The largest horizontal extent:
  Jaskinia Miętusia in the Western Tatras, with the horizontal extent of ca. 1135 m
- The highest cave:
  Świnicka Koleba, a tiny tectonic granite cave in mount Świnica in the High Tatras, at ca. 2250 m above sea level
- The deepest underground pitch:
  Studnia Wazeliniarzy (pun – "lickspittles shaft" or "vaseliners shaft") in Śnieżna Studnia in the Western Tatras, with the depth of ca. 230 m
- The largest underground chamber:
  Sala Fakro in Jaskinia Mała w Mułowej in the Western Tatras, with the size of ca. 85 × 35 × 90 m
- The largest underground lake:
  Wielki Kłamca ("the great pretender") in Ptasia Studnia in the Western Tatras, with the size of ca. 6 × 20 m
- The oldest human species in Poland:
  Tunel Wielki

== Biology ==
Notable troglobionts, troglophiles, and trogloxenes of Polish caves include:

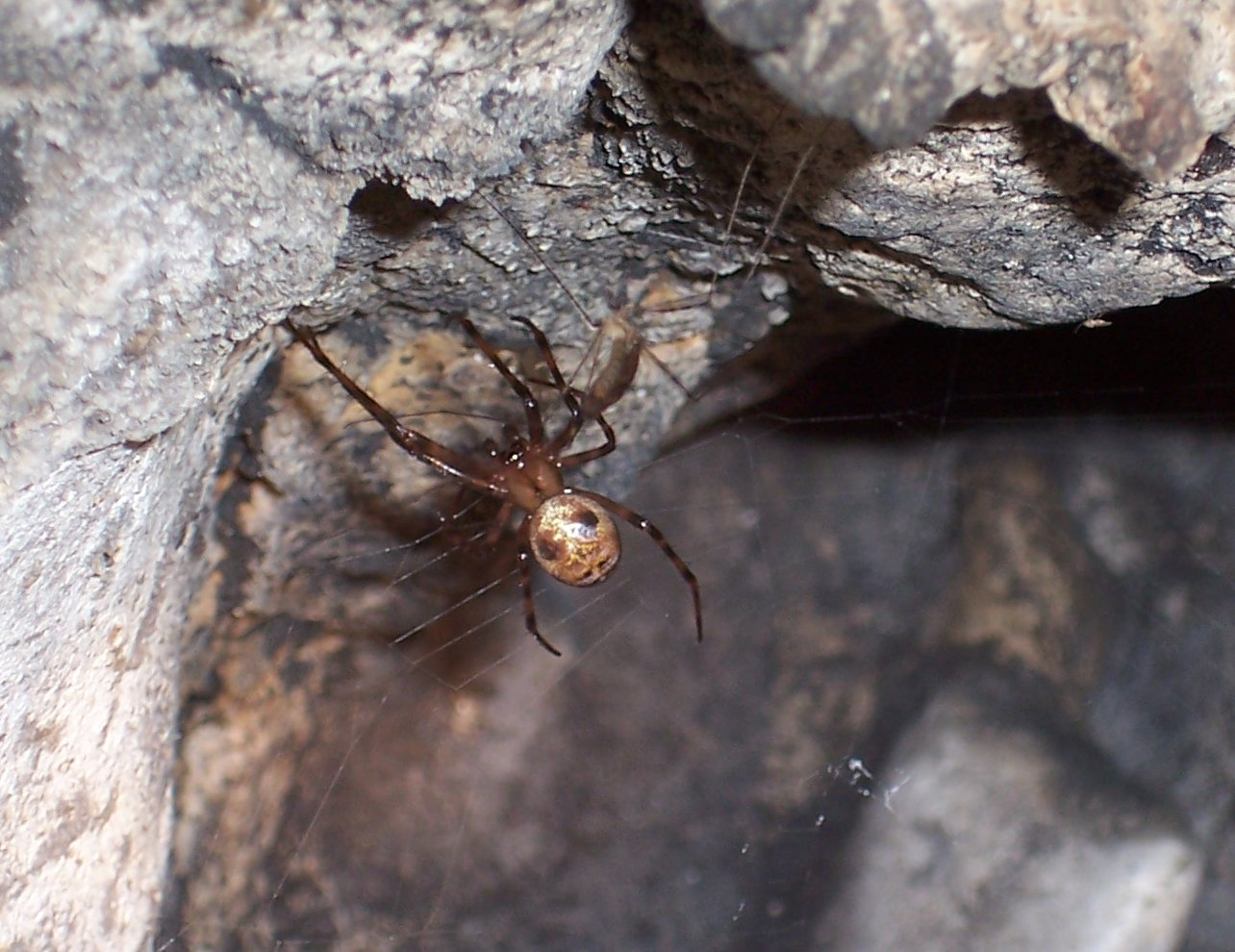
Meta menardi

=== Crustaceans ===
- Acanthocyclops languidoides clandestinus
- Bathynella natans
- Niphargus tatrensis
- Proasellus slavus
- Synurella ambulans tenebrarum

=== Arachnids ===
- Lobohalacarus weberi quadriporus
- Meta menardi – European cave spider
- Oribella cavatica
- Porrhomma moravicum
- Pseudanophthalmus pilosellus

=== Insects ===
- Arrhopalites pygmaeus
- Catops tristis infernus
- Choleva lederiana
- Mesogastrura ojcoviensis
- Onychiurus alborufescens
- Protaphorura janosik

=== Bats ===
17 out of 21 species of Polish bats can be found in caves – most of them only in winter, during their hibernation.

- Barbastella barbastellus – Barbastelle
- Eptesicus nilssoni – Northern bat
- Eptesicus serotinus – Serotine bat
- Myotis bechsteini – Bechstein's bat
- Myotis brandti – Brandt's bat
- Myotis dasycneme – Pond bat
- Myotis daubentoni – Daubenton's bat
- Myotis emarginatus – Geoffroy's bat
- Myotis myotis – Greater mouse-eared bat
- Myotis mystacinus – Whiskered bat
- Myotis nattereri – Natterer's bat
- Nyctalus noctula – Common noctule
- Plecotus auritus – Brown long-eared bat
- Plecotus austriacus – Grey long-eared bat
- Rhinolophus ferrumequinum – Greater horseshoe bat
- Rhinolophus hipposideros – Lesser horseshoe bat
- Vespertilio murinus – Parti-coloured bat

== See also ==
- List of caves
