= Gruszczyn, Lower Silesian Voivodeship =

Gruszczyn
- Location within Poland
- Coordinates: 50°21′38″N 16°50′52″E
- Country: Poland
- Voivodeship: Lower Silesian
- County: Kłodzko
- Gmina: Lądek-Zdrój
- Time zone: UTC+1 (CET)
  - Summer (DST): UTC+2 (CEST)
- Car plates: DKL

Gruszczyn (Polish: [ˈɡru.ʂt͡ʂɘ̟n]; German until 1945: Richtergrund [ˈʁɪçtɐˌɡʁʊnt], lit. 'Knight's ground') is a hamlet near the village of Radochów, Lower Silesian Voivodeship, Poland located in the Gmina Lądek-Zdrój, Kłodzko County.

== History ==
In the 19th century, in the hamlet was located a watermill and inn, that was popular among tourists from Lądek-Zdrój heading to Radochowska Cave. The inn was popular and mentioned by travel guides at the time. After 1945, when the area was transferred from Germany to Poland, the hamlet got renamed from Richtergrund into Gruszczyn, and remained a small agricultural settlement. In 1978, it contained 5 farms.
