= Krystyna Pawłowicz =

Polish politician

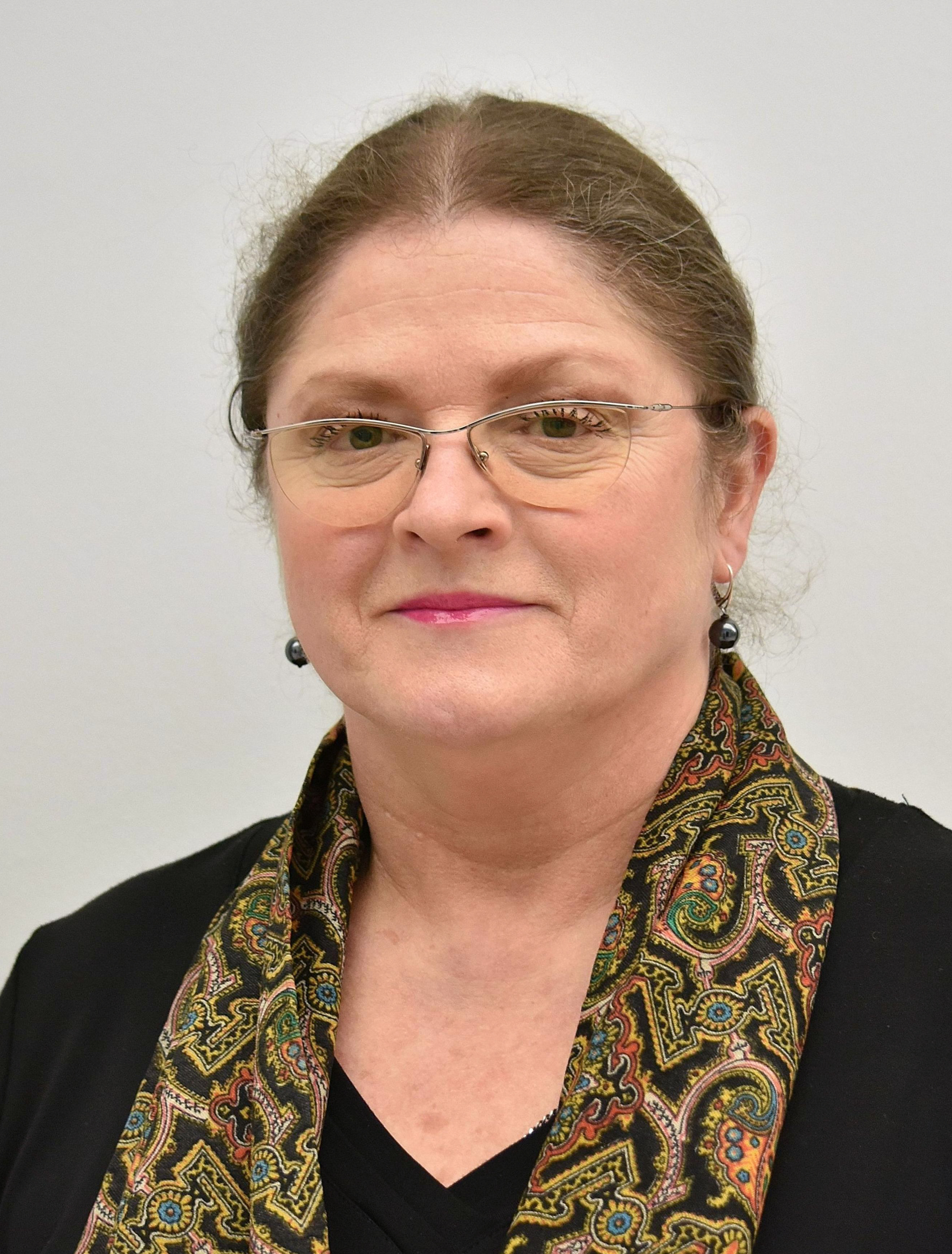
- Official portrait, 2016

Judge of the Constitutional Tribunal
- In office 5 December 2019 – 5 December 2025

Member of the Sejm
- In office 9 October 2011 – 12 November 2019

Personal details
- Born: 14 April 1952 (age 74) Wojcieszów, Poland
- Party: Law and Justice
- Education: University of Warsaw
- Profession: lawyer
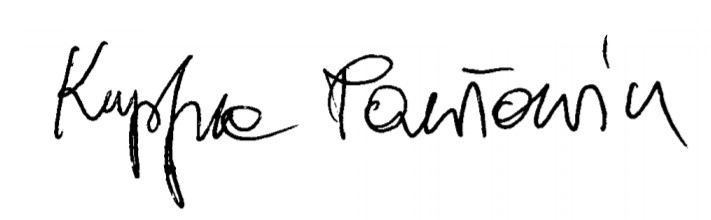
- Signature

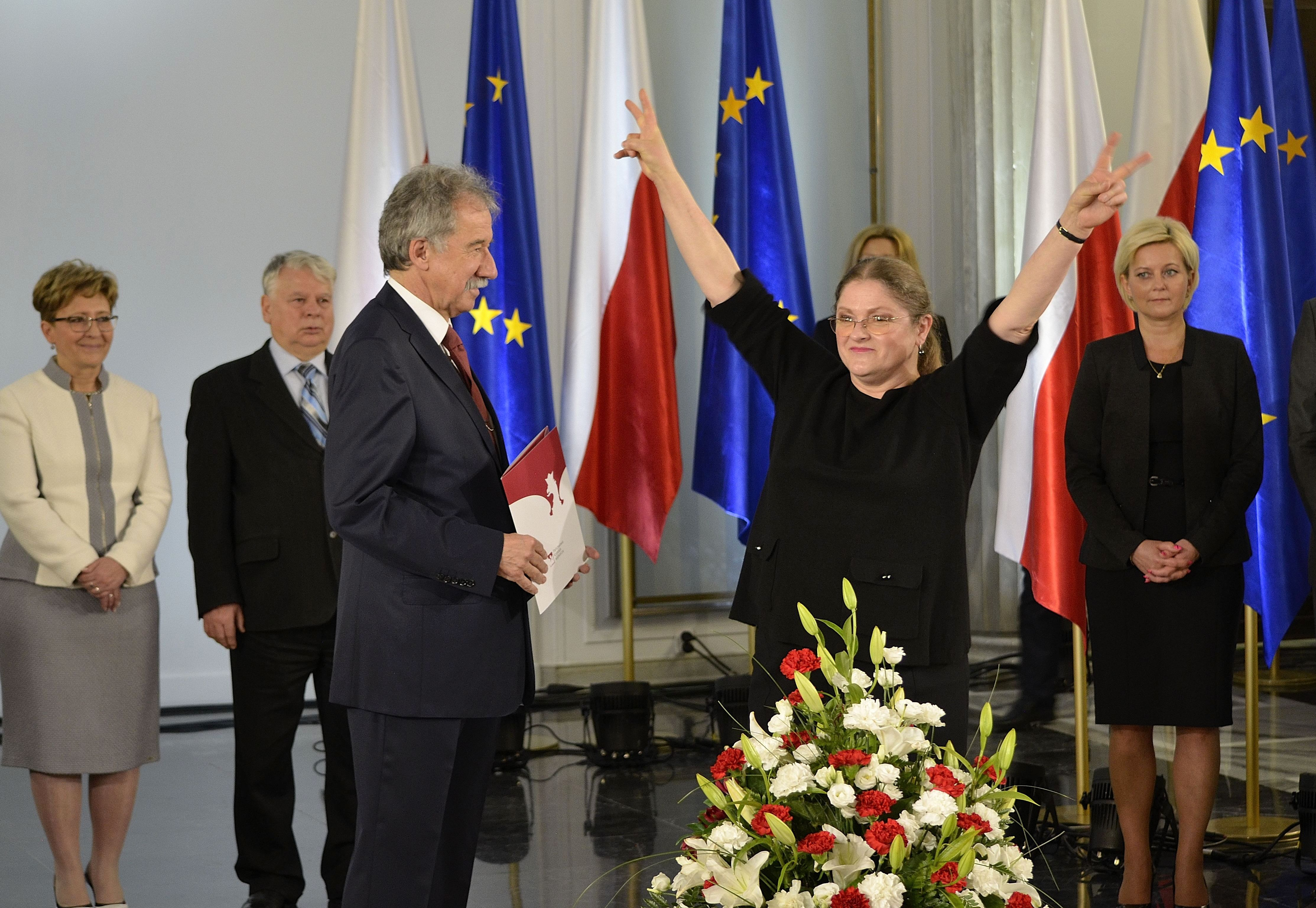
Pawłowicz in the Column Hall during the ceremony of presenting certificates of election

Krystyna Pawłowicz (born 14 April 1952 in Wojcieszów) is a Polish jurist and political figure. In the years 2007–2011, Pawłowicz was a Justice of the State Tribunal. She was a member of the Sejm (7th and 8th term) and was part of the National Council of the Judiciary. Pawłowicz was a judge of the Constitutional Tribunal from 5 December 2019 to 5 December 2025. She has taught at the University of Warsaw and the School of Public Administration in Ostrołęka.

== Views ==
Pawłowicz has come to international attention for her negative views on same sex marriage and immigration. Her controversial statements are considered to be hate speech by many commentators.

Pawłowicz is regarded as belonging to the more Eurosceptic wing of the Law and Justice (PiS) party, and has regularly described the European Union, its flag, or both as being a "rag". In 2009, she called the Treaty of Lisbon an anti-democratic instrument. In June 2013, she said the Union was "worse than communism" and that she was "waiting and praying" for it to disband by itself. In February 2014, she called the Union a "brothel in which everything is permitted". In May 2022, she expressed her desire for the Union to "disappear from the face of the earth"; in August of the same year, she called for the Polish criminal code to be amended so that Polish MEPs and Union employees could face criminal liability for what she called their disloyalty to Poland.

She calls for a “ban [on] 90 percent of today’s abortions”.

In 2013 during a debate of legalising gay marriage she asked “Are sexual ties the only reason why society should finance a barren existence?”

She has accused the German government of deliberately concealing crimes committed by refugees and immigrants.

She accused Jean Claude Juncker of being an alcoholic after his actions during an audience with the Pope.

She has called George Soros the "most dangerous man in the world" on Radio Maryja, a Catholic broadcaster. She said his foundations "finance anti-Christian and anti-national activities."

After 2023 Polish parliamentary election she has written on her Twitter account about the future government that they are Polish killers. This caused a backlash among other Twitter users and fueled further doubts about the state of rule of law in Poland.
