= Orłowiec =

- Village
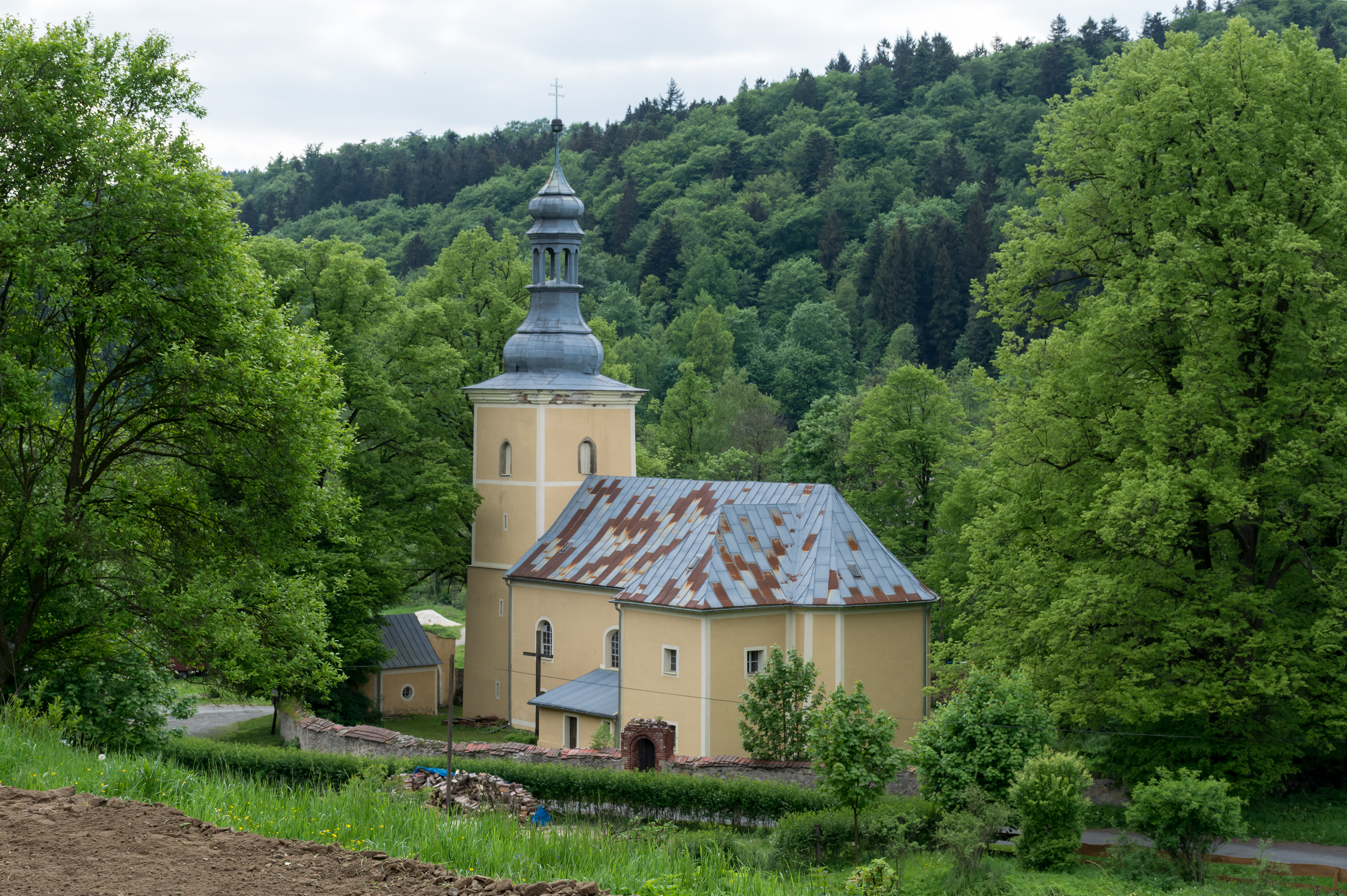
- Church of Saint Sebastian

- Location within Poland
- Coordinates: 50°23′19″N 16°51′30″E
- Country: Poland
- Voivodeship: Lower Silesian
- County: Kłodzko
- Gmina: Lądek-Zdrój

Orłowiec [ɔrˈwɔvjɛt͡s] (German: Schönau bei Bad Landeck, Czech: Šenov) is a village in the administrative district of Gmina Lądek-Zdrój, Kłodzko County, Lower Silesian Voivodeship, in south-western Poland, near the border with the Czech Republic.
