= Wójtówka, Lower Silesian Voivodeship =

Wójtówka
- Village
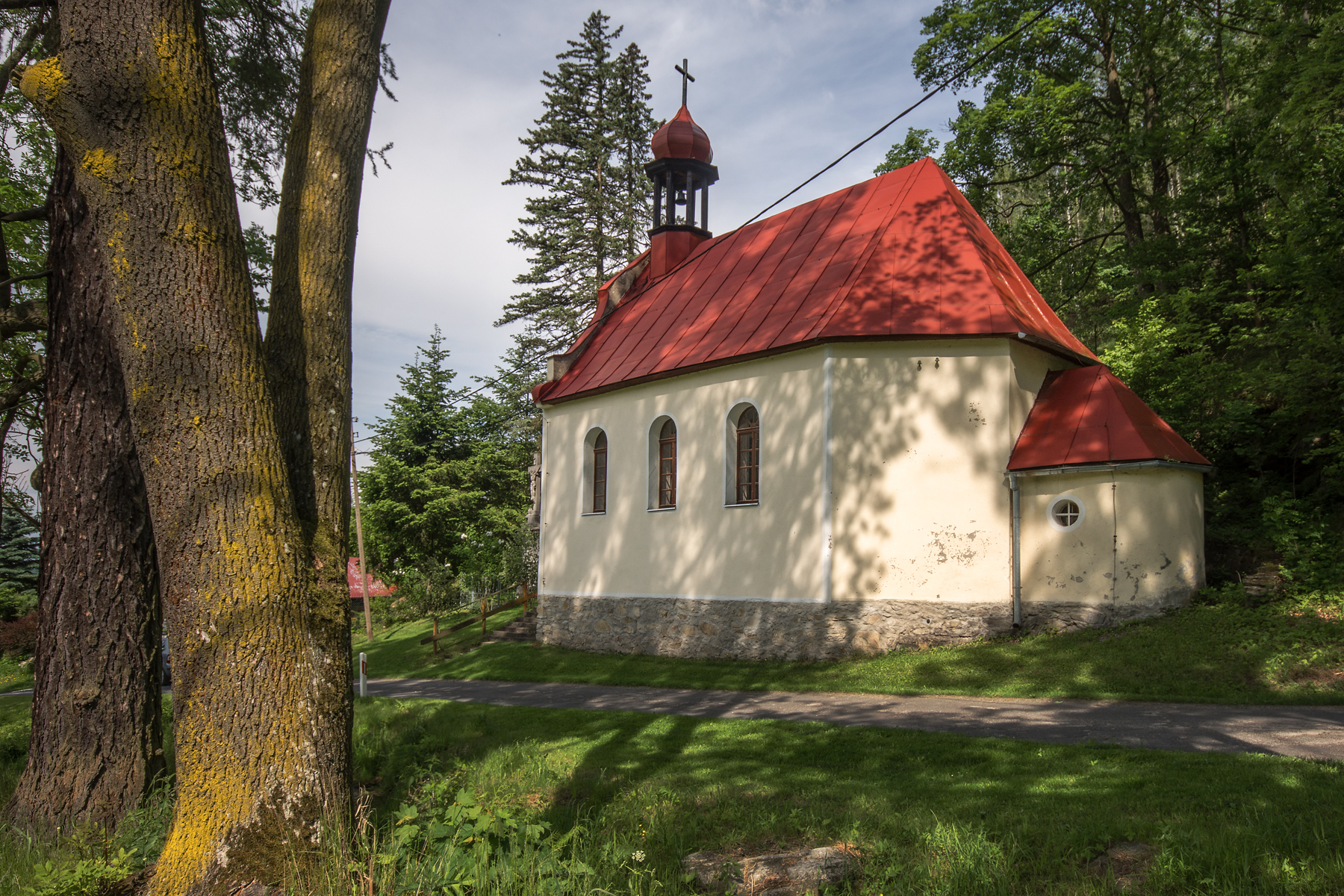
- Church of Saint Anthony of Padua

- Location within Poland
- Coordinates: 50°22′18″N 16°52′59″E
- Country: Poland
- Voivodeship: Lower Silesian
- County: Kłodzko
- Gmina: Lądek-Zdrój

Population
  - Total: 69

Wójtówka [vui̯ˈtufka] is a village in the administrative district of Gmina Lądek-Zdrój, within Kłodzko County, Lower Silesian Voivodeship, in south-western Poland.
