= Kąty Bystrzyckie =

- Village
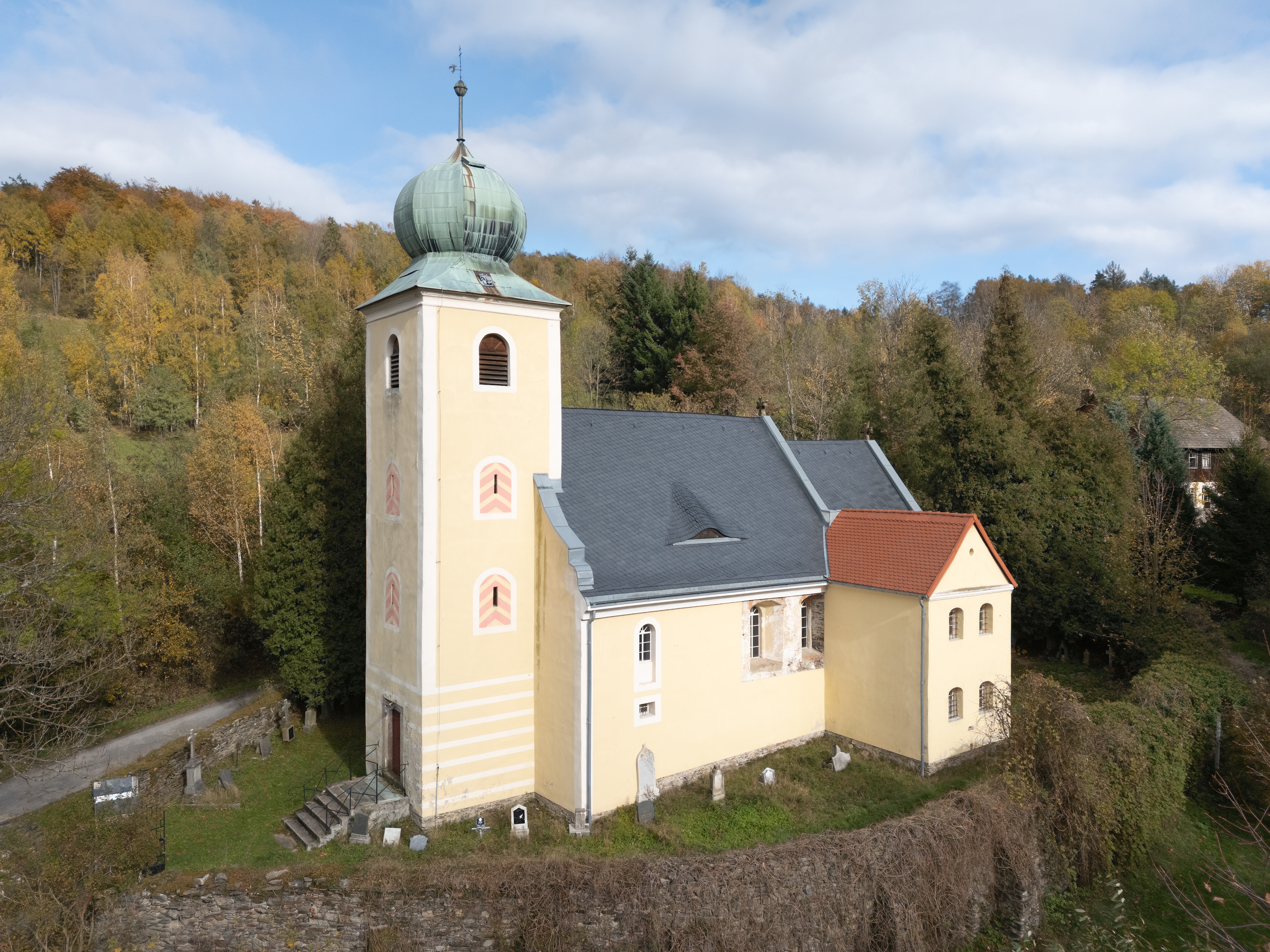
- Church of Saint Catherine of Alexandria

- Location within Poland
- Coordinates: 50°18′N 16°49′E
- Country: Poland
- Voivodeship: Lower Silesian
- County: Kłodzko
- Gmina: Lądek-Zdrój
- Elevation (max.): 610 m (2,000 ft)

Population
  - Total: 68

Kąty Bystrzyckie [ˈkɔntɨ bɨsˈtʂɨt͡skʲɛ] (German: Winkeldorf) is a village in the administrative district of Gmina Lądek-Zdrój, within Kłodzko County, Lower Silesian Voivodeship, in south-western Poland.
