= Jaskinia Wielka Śnieżna =

Cave in Poland

Coordinates: 49°14′24″N 19°55′23″E

Jaskinia Wielka Śnieżna ("great snowy cave") is a limestone cave system in Mount Małołączniak in the Western Tatra Mountains, of the Carpathian Mountains System, in southern Poland. The cave is within Tatra National Park.

With the length of 23.723 kilometres (14.741 mi), and vertical range of 824 metres (2,703 ft), it is the longest, largest, and deepest cave in Poland.

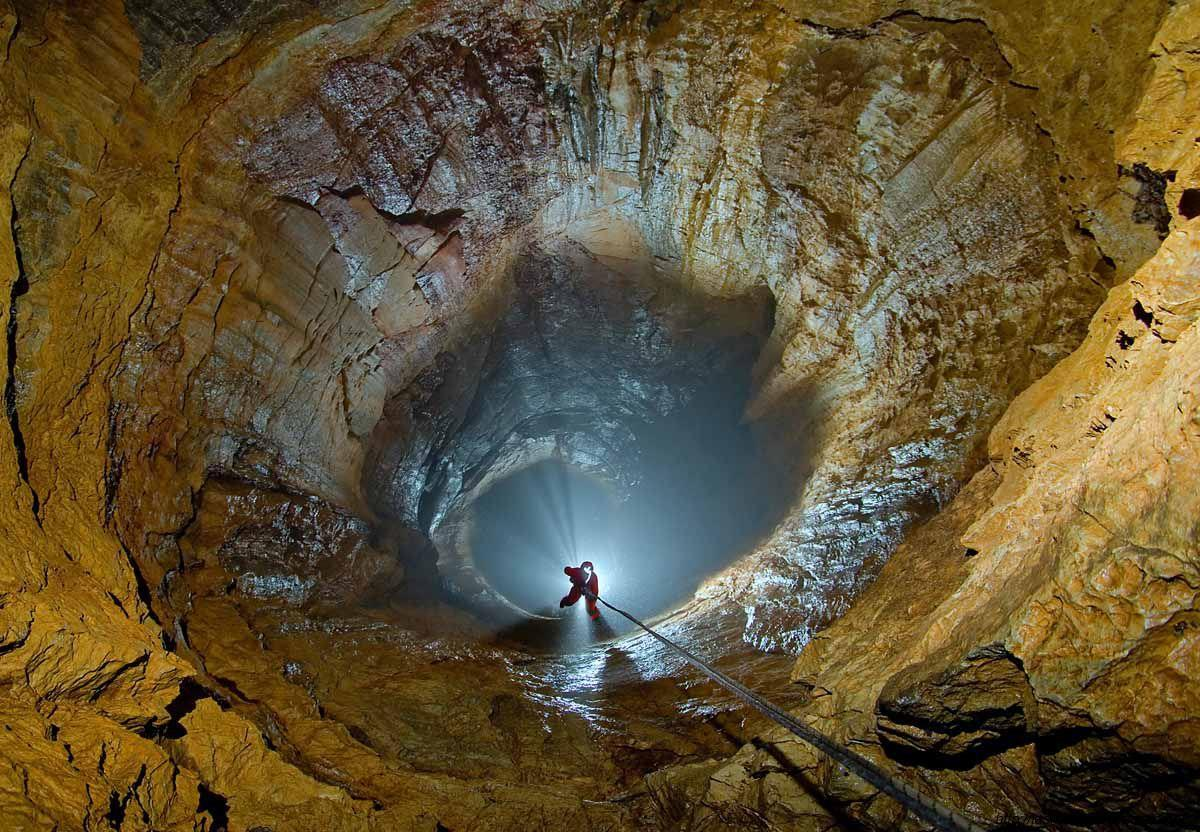
Wielka Studnia — a 66 metre pitch near one of the entrances

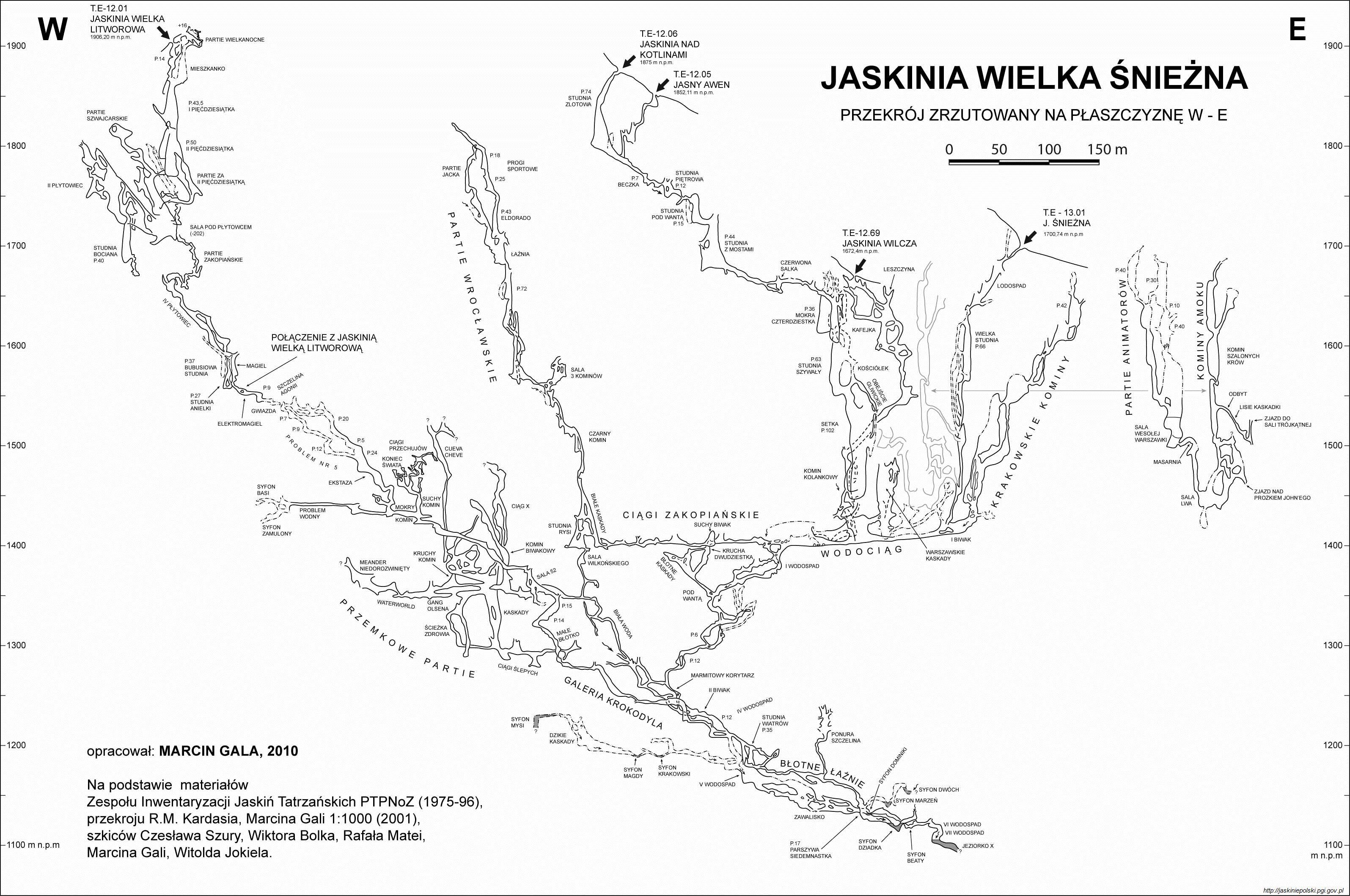
Simplified cross-sectional view

== Morphology ==
Wielka Śnieżna has five entrances:

- Jaskinia Śnieżna ("snowy cave") – 1,701 metres (5,581 ft) – discovered in 1959
- Jaskinia nad Kotlinami ("cave over the kettles") – 1,875 metres (6,152 ft) – discovered in 1966, connected to Śnieżna in 1968
- Jasny Awen ("light aven") – 1,852 metres (6,076 ft) – first explored in 1959, connected to Wielka Śnieżna in 1978
- Jaskinia Wielka Litworowa ("great angelica cave") – 1,906 metres (6,253 ft) – connected to Wielka Śnieżna in 1995
- Jaskinia Wilcza ("wolf cave") – 1,672 metres (5,486 ft) – discovered in 1996, connected to Wielka Śnieżna in 1999

They are connected by a complicated system of shafts and passages. Several of them contain underground trickles, waterfalls, pools, or siphons. The cave is drained by a karst spring known as Lodowe Źródło ("icy spring").

== Exploration ==
Jaskinia Śnieżna was discovered in 1959 by cavers from Zakopane. In 1960, it was explored to a depth of 545 m (1,788 ft), which made it, at that time, the fourth-deepest cave in the world. In the subsequent years, the cave was intensively explored and connected with other caves.

Exploration in the 1960s bottomed out at a sump or siphon, a U-shaped tunnel filled with water, at a depth of 752 m (2,467 ft). In 1972, cavers using scuba diving gear were able to push past the sump for the first time. Their exploration pushed down to a depth of 783 m (2,569 ft).

Subsequent efforts have found the cave to be 824 m (2,703 ft) deep. Exploration of the cave is still ongoing, including attempts to connect the cave to Śnieżna Studnia, second-largest cave in Poland.

== See also ==
- Caves of Poland
- Tatra Mountains
