= Radochów Cave =

Cave in Poland

Coordinates: 50°21′32″N 16°49′04″E

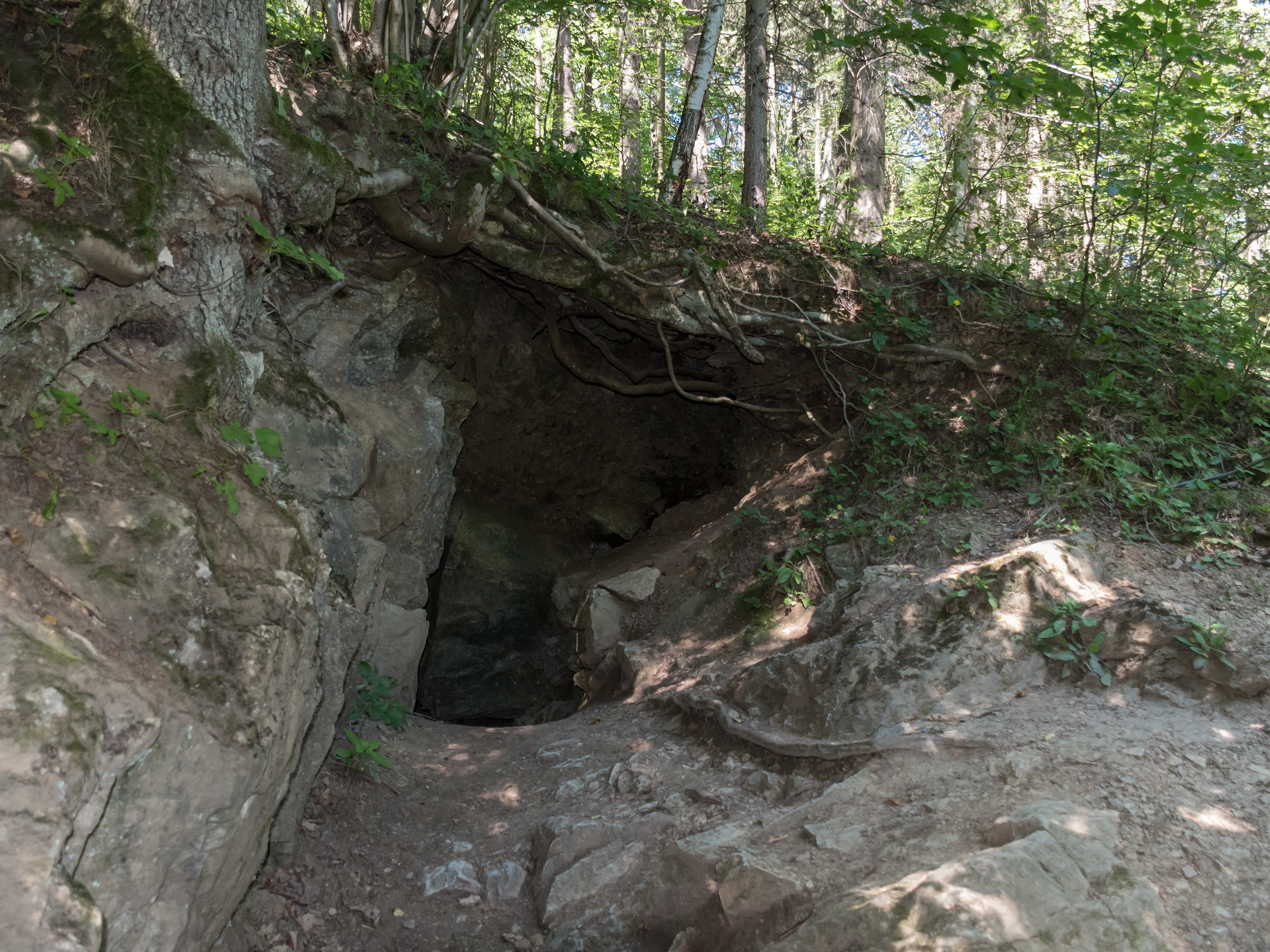
Entrance to the cave

The Radochów Cave (German: Kunzendorfer Höhle, Reyersdorfer Tropfsteinhöhle) is a karst cave in lenticular marble. It is situated in the valley of the Jaskiniec Stream, at the foot of Bzowiec in the Golden Mountains of (East Sudetes), near the village of Radochów (municipality Lądek-Zdrój), Poland.

== Geology ==
The Radochów Cave was formed in the Pliocene (5-1.6 million years ago) by the leaching of water-soluble marbles in a lens of white marble, partly on contact with schist (gray-yellow, friable rock). It was formed under the erosive action of waters filling the entire cross-section of its passages flowing under high pressure. At the end of the Pliocene, the intensification of erosion of the surrounding slopes led to the deepening of the valley, and thus to the lowering of the channel of a stream flowing nearby. A decrease in karst waters occurred, which led to the dehydration of the area near the cave opening and the formation of hollow spaces. Corridors developed along tectonic cracks and fissures. Larger halls were formed at their intersections.

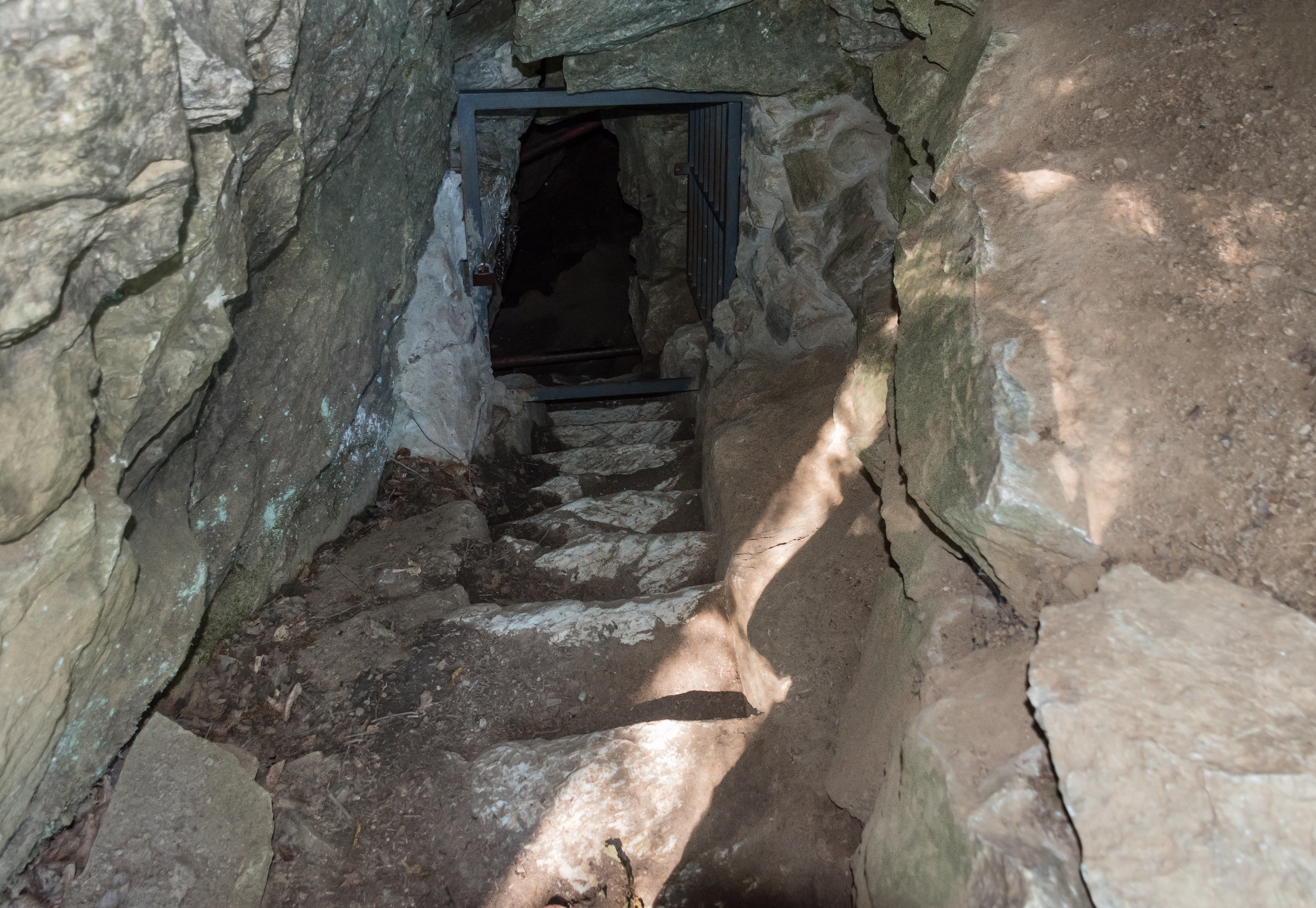
Entrance to the cave

In the corridors drained in this way the process of deposition of alluvium has begun. The alluvium of the Radochów Cave consists of weathered schist that falls from the cave ceiling and walls, rubble, precipitated calcium carbonate and organic substances (e.g. animal bones) originating from the surface (deposited by water). The alluvium filled the cave chambers and passages almost completely. It was mostly removed between 1933 and 1939.

== History ==
Discovered in the second half of the 18th century. The first mention of the cave dates back to 1757. Shortly afterwards it became a popular destination for spa patients from Lądek-Zdrój and tourists. Due to numerous visitors the cave suffered severe damage - its former splendour is evidenced by its other names: Reyersdorfer Tropsteinhöhle - Radochów Dripstone Cave or Stalactite Cave. From 1933 to 1947 the cave had a permanent custodian and guide, a retired miner named Heinrich Peregrin. The content of the alluvium was examined in 1935 by G. Frenzel and a year later by L. Zotz. The bones of about 20 different prehistoric animals were found, and in the front part of the cave the bones of several species of modern origin. L. Zotz also found quartzite products and limb coals, and in one of the niches a skull of a cave bear, and next to it, 3 cervical vertebrae and a mandible. This gave rise to assumptions about the presence of the Paleolithic man in this cave. Currently, this theory is not supported.

Before World War II the cave was a tourist destination. A wooden building was erected nearby, which served as an accommodation for the watchman. It also served as a waiting room for tourists, where paleontological findings were displayed in showcases. The display cases were looted in the 1950s, and the building burned down in July in the late 1960s.

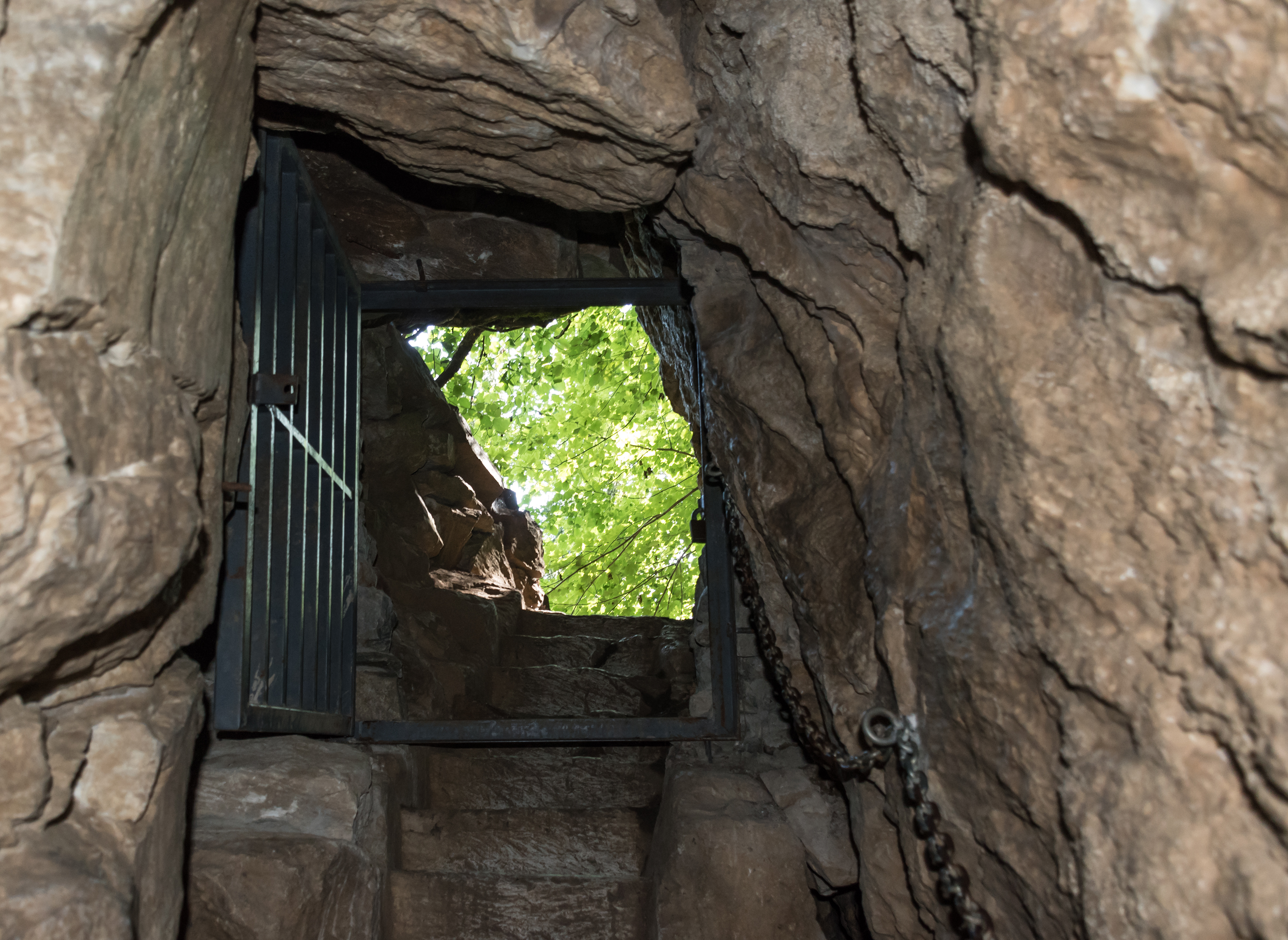
Exit from the cave

It is likely that in November 1945, a five-member Werwolf sabotage group was captured in the cave, which served as its base. However, this is not confirmed by other sources.

== Natural conditions ==
The cave contains heavily damaged dripstone: woolly, cascade and drapery as well as traces of stalactites and stalagmites. It is one of the largest and best explored caves in the Sudetes. Bones of a cave bear, a cave hyena, a wild horse, and a woolly rhinoceros were found inside. Many interesting representatives of the fauna live here, such as the Tatra niphargus, flys and troglochaetus beranecki. It is also a wintering site for the following bats: greater mouse-eared bat, Daubenton's myotis, brown long-eared bat, western barbastelle and serotine bat.

Currently, there are three artificial entrances to the cave. The temperature inside the cave is constant, about 9 °C. The cave consists of a almost parallel to the slope narrow connecting passage, running almost horizontally and several transverse, shorter passages, as well as numerous cavities and chambers. The most interesting chamber is the so-called Gothic Chamber, located at the extension of the central entrance. It is a triangular room with a karst lake of about 30 m^{2} and a depth of about 2 m. The system of karst fissures is still active and the water level fluctuates seasonally. The whole cave is protected as a monument of inanimate nature.

== Tourism ==
The cave is open from May to September daily from 10:00 to 18:00 (last entry at 17:20). Groups are accompanied by qualified guides. There is a tourist shelter on the meadow in front of the cave. The following tourist trails lead to the cave:

- The green hiking trail from the bus stop in Radochów on the route Kłodzko-Lądek-Zdrój (about 30 minutes),
- The blue trail from Lądek-Zdrój through Radochów and the Calvary on Cierniak (about 80 minutes).

It is possible to reach the cave from Radochów via a dirt and gravel road.

In the 1990s, a seasonal student tent base called AKG Halny was open right next to the cave.

== Bibliography ==
- Jaskinie Sudetów praca zbiorowa pod red. Mariana Puliny, Polskie Towarzystwo Przyjaciół Nauk o Ziemi, Warszawa 1996, ISBN 83-900997-9-9.
- Wojciech Ciężkowski Lądek Zdrój, Dolnośląskie Wydawnictwo Edukacyjne, Wrocław 1998, ISBN 83-7125-044-4.
- Jaskinia Niedźwiedzia w Kletnie. 40 lat eksploracji, badań, ochrony i turystyki praca zbiorowa pod red. Wojciecha Ciężkowskiego, Wydawnictwo „Maria”, Wrocław-Kletno 2006, ISBN 83-60478-16-3.
- Słownik geografii turystycznej Sudetów, tom 17 Góry Złote, red. Marek Staffa, str. 86–88, Wydawnictwo I-BiS, Wrocław 1993, ISBN 83-85773-01-0.
