= Skrzynka, Lower Silesian Voivodeship =

Skrzynka
- Village
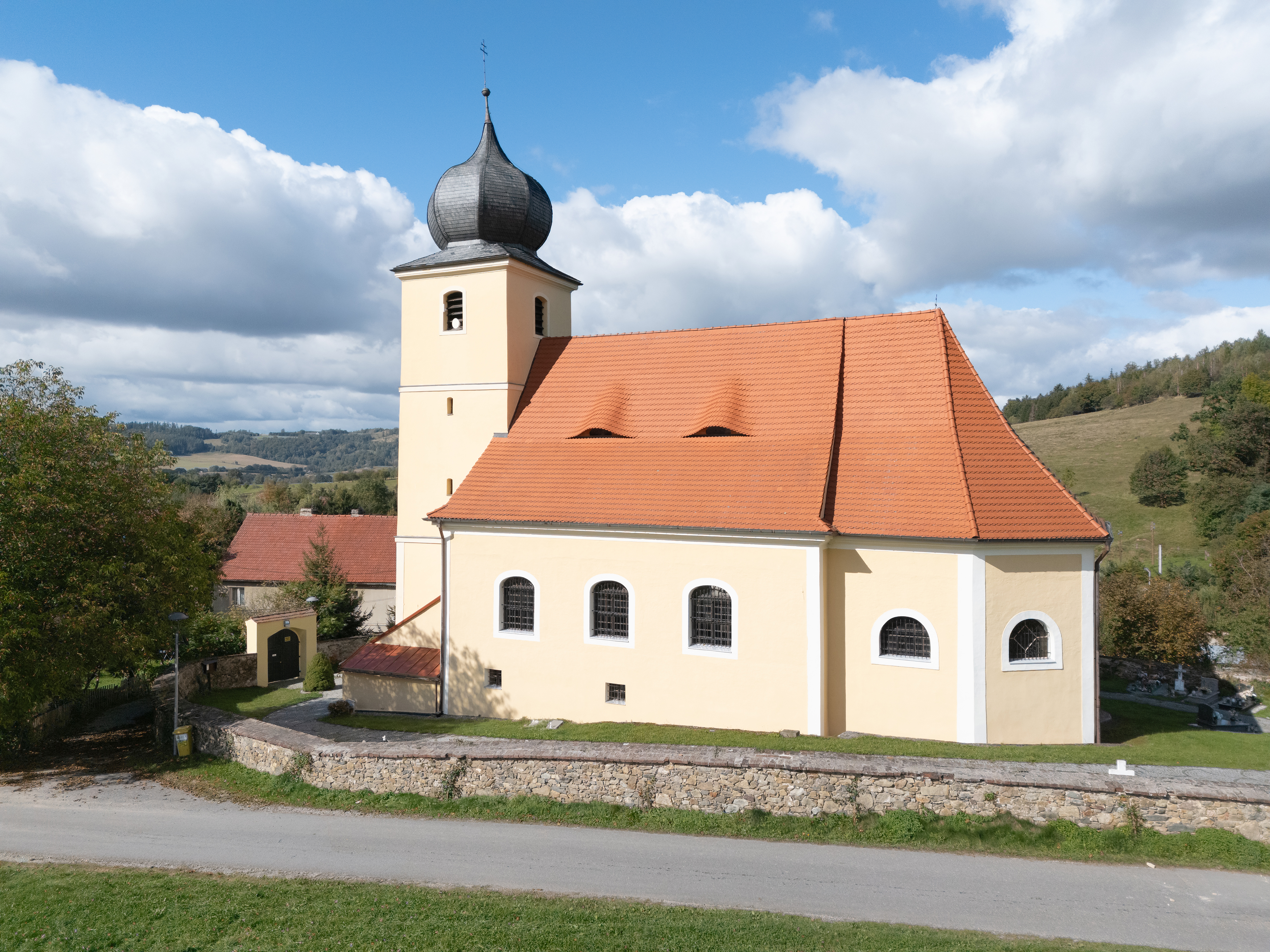
- Church of Saint Bartholomew

- Location within Poland
- Coordinates: 50°22′11″N 16°46′38″E
- Country: Poland
- Voivodeship: Lower Silesian
- County: Kłodzko
- Gmina: Lądek-Zdrój

Population
  - Total: 382

Skrzynka [ˈskʂɨŋka] is a village in the administrative district of Gmina Lądek-Zdrój, within Kłodzko County, Lower Silesian Voivodeship, in south-western Poland.

The German name of the village, Heinzendorf, derives from the name of the lokator who brought German farmers to the village.
