= Lutynia, Kłodzko County =

Lutynia
- Village
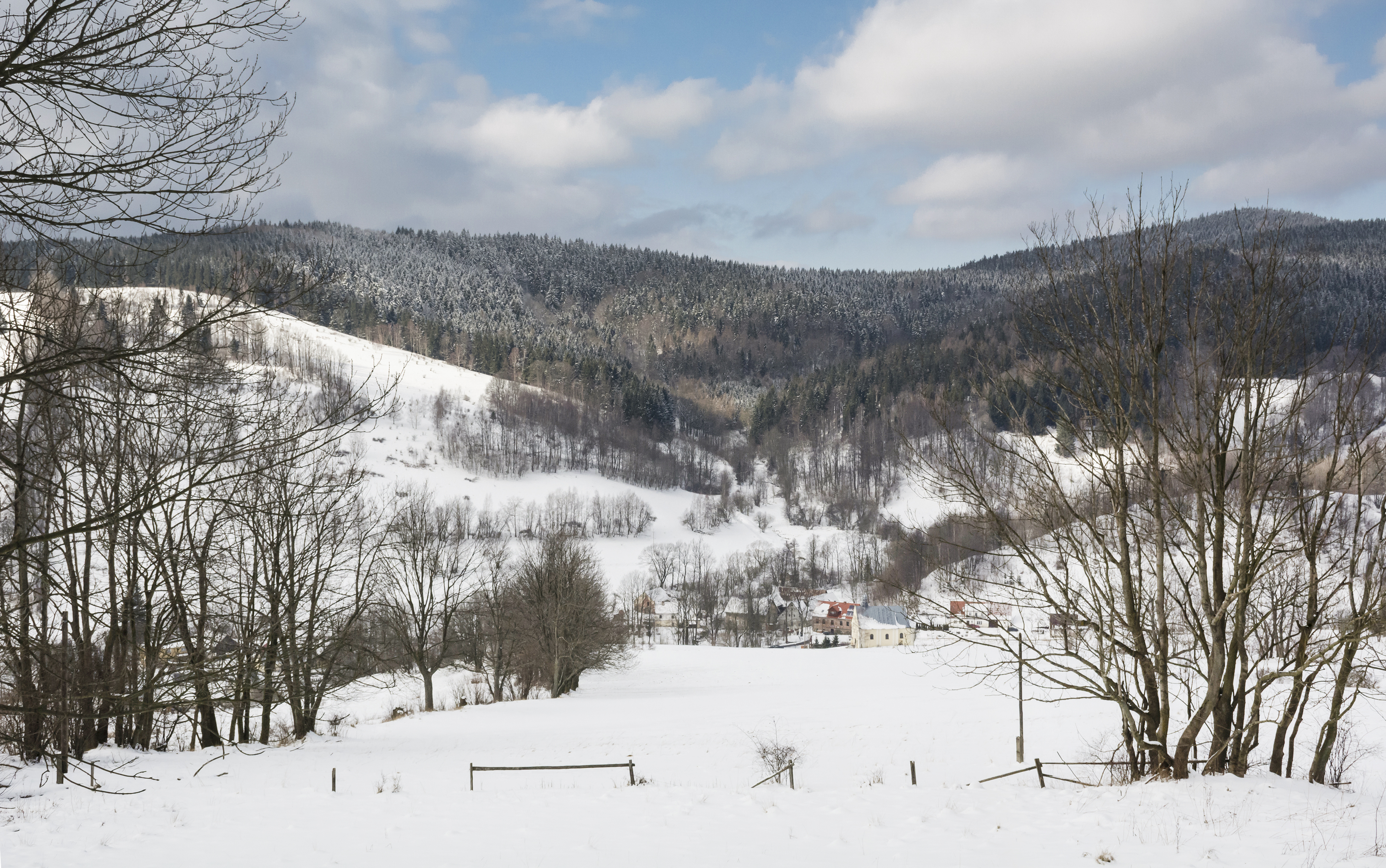
- View from the east

- Location within Poland
- Coordinates: 50°21′50″N 16°54′13″E
- Country: Poland
- Voivodeship: Lower Silesian
- County: Kłodzko
- Gmina: Lądek-Zdrój
- Population: 68

Lutynia [luˈtɨɲa] is a village in the administrative district of Gmina Lądek-Zdrój, within Kłodzko County, Lower Silesian Voivodeship, in south-western Poland.
