= Konradów, Lower Silesian Voivodeship =

Konradów
- Village
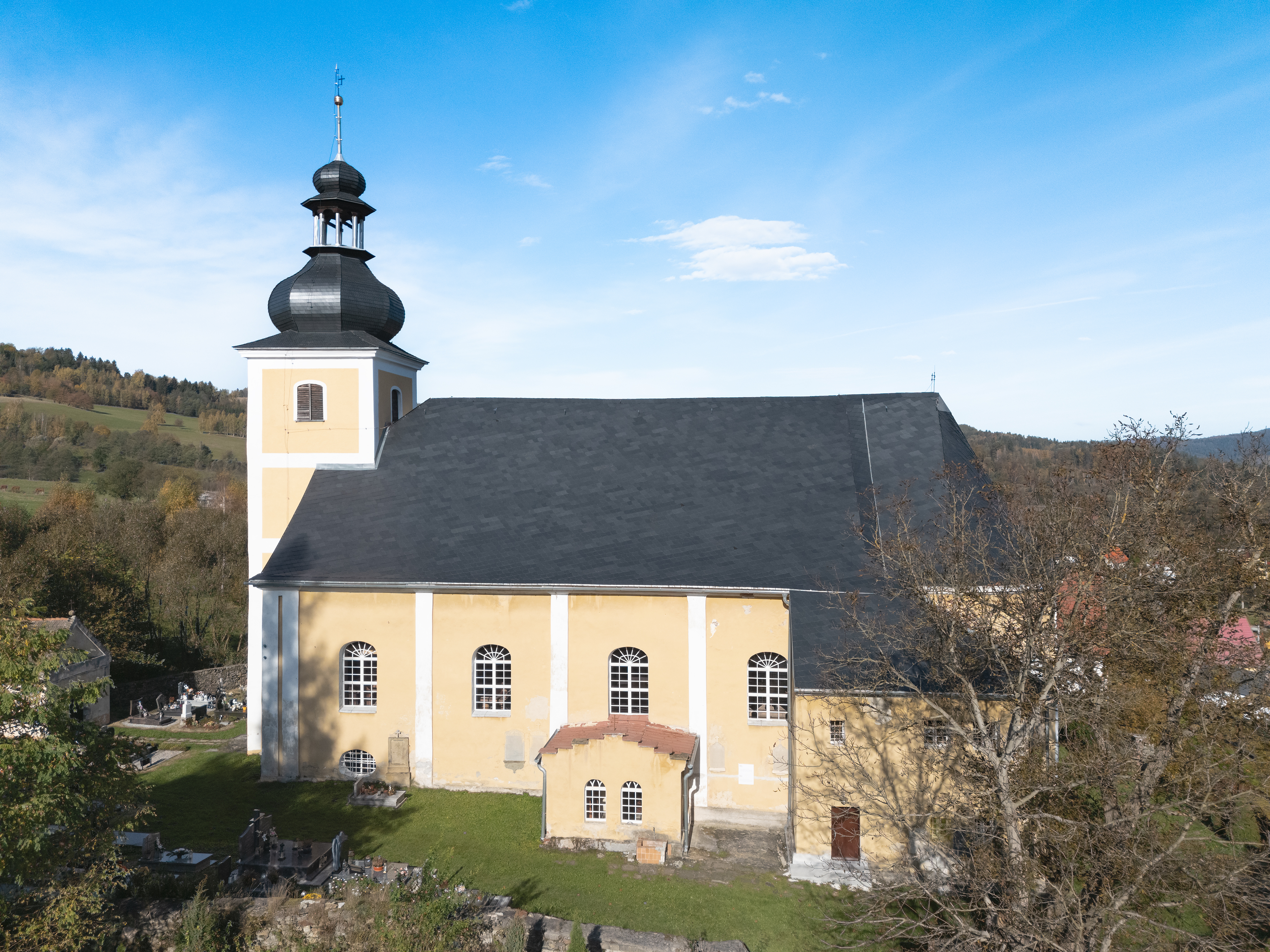
- Church of the Exaltation of the Cross

- Location within Poland
- Coordinates: 50°18′40″N 16°47′38″E
- Country: Poland
- Voivodeship: Lower Silesian
- County: Kłodzko
- Gmina: Lądek-Zdrój

Population
  - Total: 310

Konradów [kɔnˈraduf] is a village in the administrative district of Gmina Lądek-Zdrój, within Kłodzko County, Lower Silesian Voivodeship, in south-western Poland.
