= Gmina Lądek-Zdrój =

Gmina Lądek-Zdrój Lądek-Zdrój Commune
- Gmina
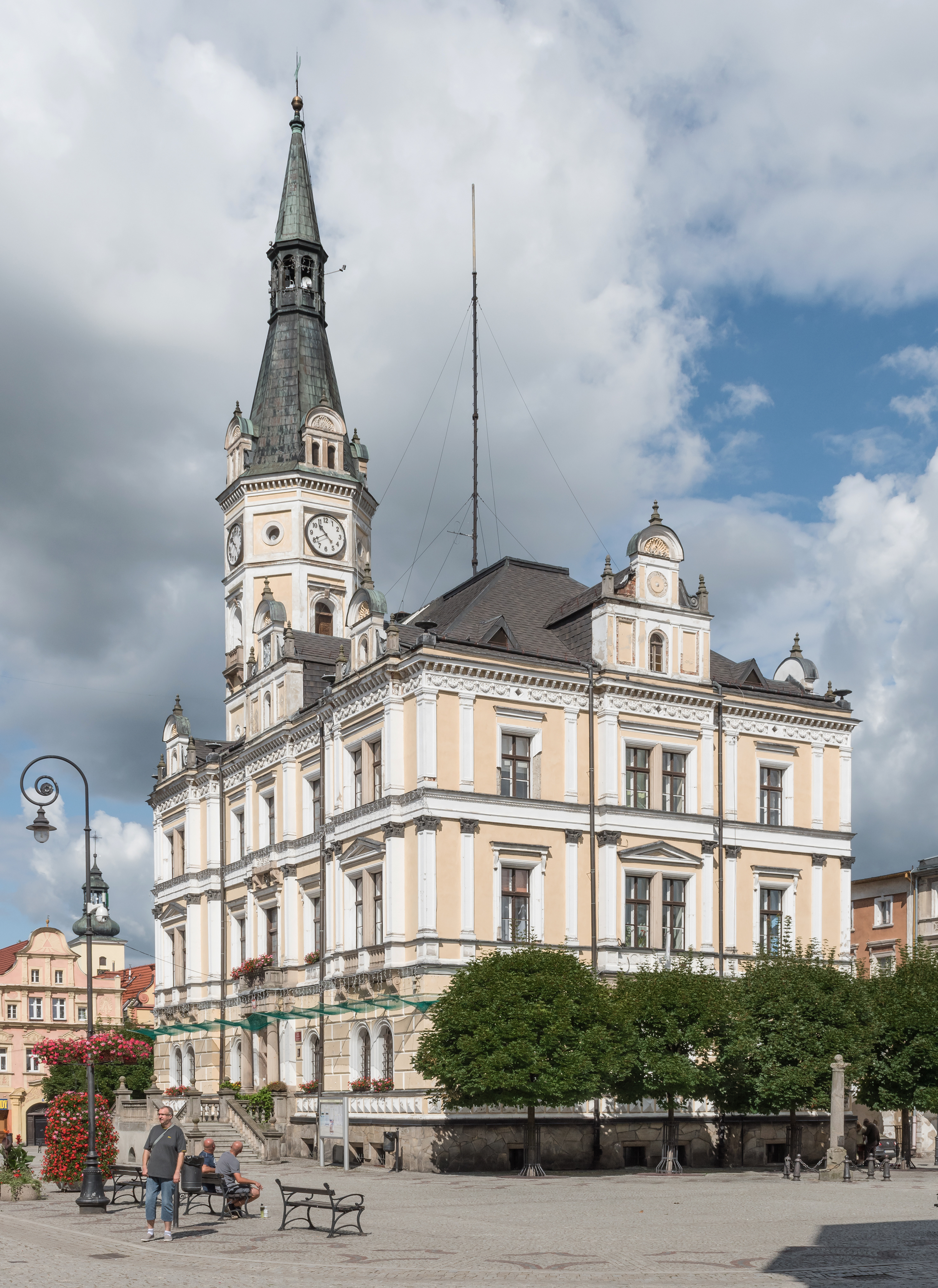
- Town Hall in Lądek-Zdrój, seat of the gmina office

- Flag Coat of arms
- Interactive map of Gmina Lądek-Zdrój
- Coordinates (Lądek-Zdrój): 50°20′37″N 16°52′47″E
- Country: Poland
- Voivodeship: Lower Silesian
- County: Kłodzko
- Seat: Lądek-Zdrój

Area
  - Total: 117.4 km^{2} (45.3 sq mi)

Population (2019-06-30)
  - Total: 8,233
  - Density: 70.13/km^{2} (181.6/sq mi)
- Time zone: UTC+1 (CET)
  - Summer (DST): UTC+2 (CEST)
- Vehicle registration: DKL
- Website: http://www.ladek.pl/

Gmina Lądek-Zdrój is an urban-rural gmina (administrative district) in Kłodzko County, Lower Silesian Voivodeship, in south-western Poland. Its seat is the town of Lądek-Zdrój, which lies approximately 20 kilometres (12 mi) south-east of Kłodzko, and 88 kilometres (55 mi) south of the regional capital Wrocław.

The gmina covers an area of 117.4 square kilometres (45.3 sq mi) and as of 2019 its total population is 8,233.

== Neighbouring gminas ==
Gmina Lądek-Zdrój is bordered by the gminas of Bystrzyca Kłodzka, Kłodzko, Stronie Śląskie and Złoty Stok. It also borders the Czech Republic.

== Villages ==
Apart from the town of Lądek-Zdrój, the gmina contains the villages of Kąty Bystrzyckie, Konradów, Lutynia, Orłowiec, Radochów, Skrzynka, Stójków, Trzebieszowice and Wójtówka.

== Twin towns – sister cities ==
Gmina Lądek-Zdrój is twinned with:

- Bad Schandau, Germany
- Bernartice, Czech Republic
- Bílá Voda, Czech Republic
- Goedereede, Netherlands
- Javorník, Czech Republic
- Klášterec nad Orlicí, Czech Republic
- Otmuchów, Poland
- Paczków, Poland
- Svitavy, Czech Republic
- Uhelná, Czech Republic
- Vlčice, Czech Republic
- Złoty Stok, Poland
