= Mirachowo =

Mirachowo Mirochòwò
- Village
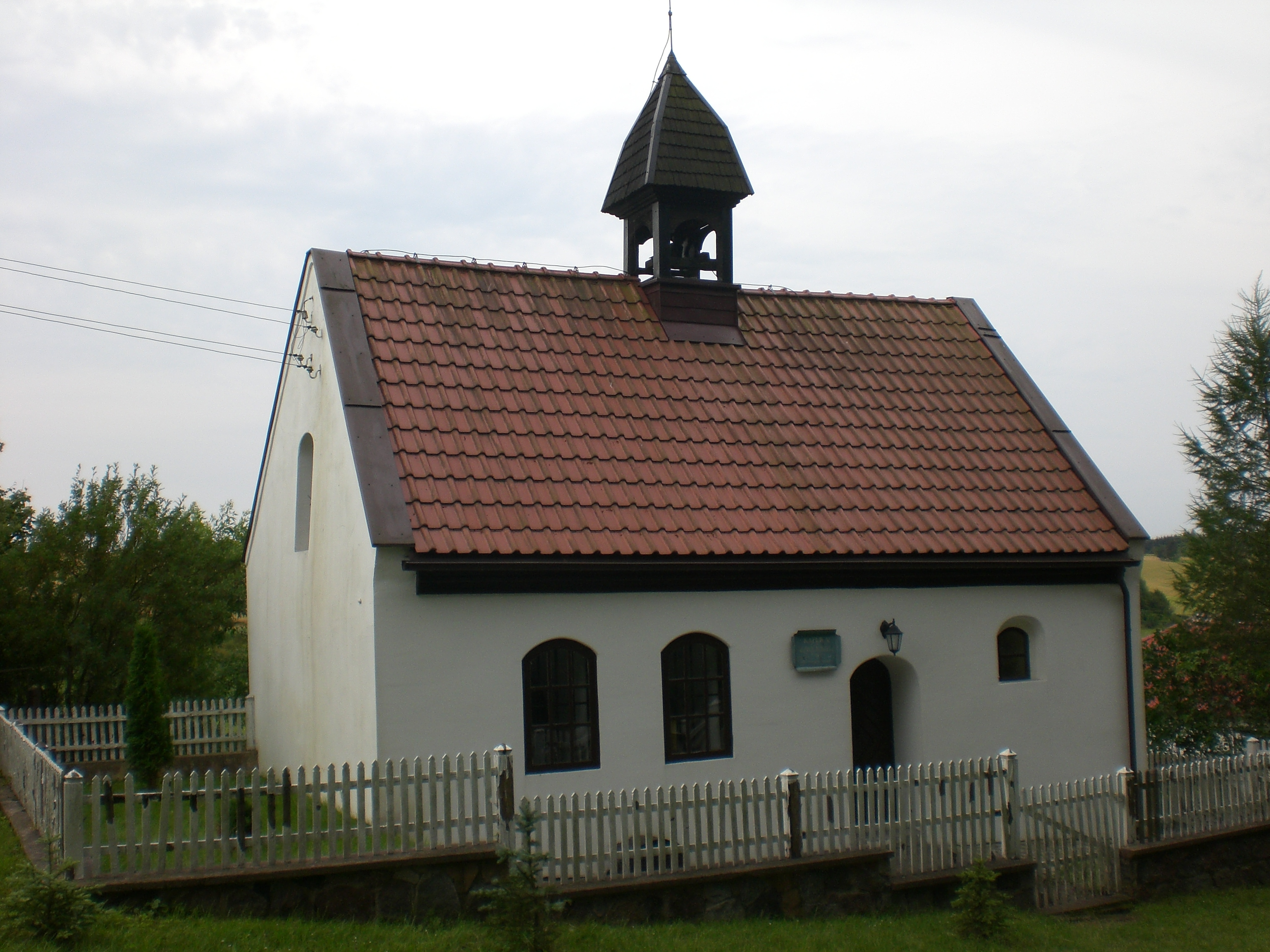
- Chapel in Mirachowo (bd. 1740)

- Location within Poland
- Coordinates: 54°23′42″N 18°1′40″E
- Country: Poland
- Voivodeship: Pomeranian
- County: Kartuzy
- Gmina: Kartuzy
- Population: 913

Mirachowo [miraˈxɔvɔ] (Kashubian: Mirochòwò) is a village in the administrative district of Gmina Kartuzy, within Kartuzy County, Pomeranian Voivodeship, in northern Poland.

For details of the history of the region, see History of Pomerania.
