= Wojcieszów =

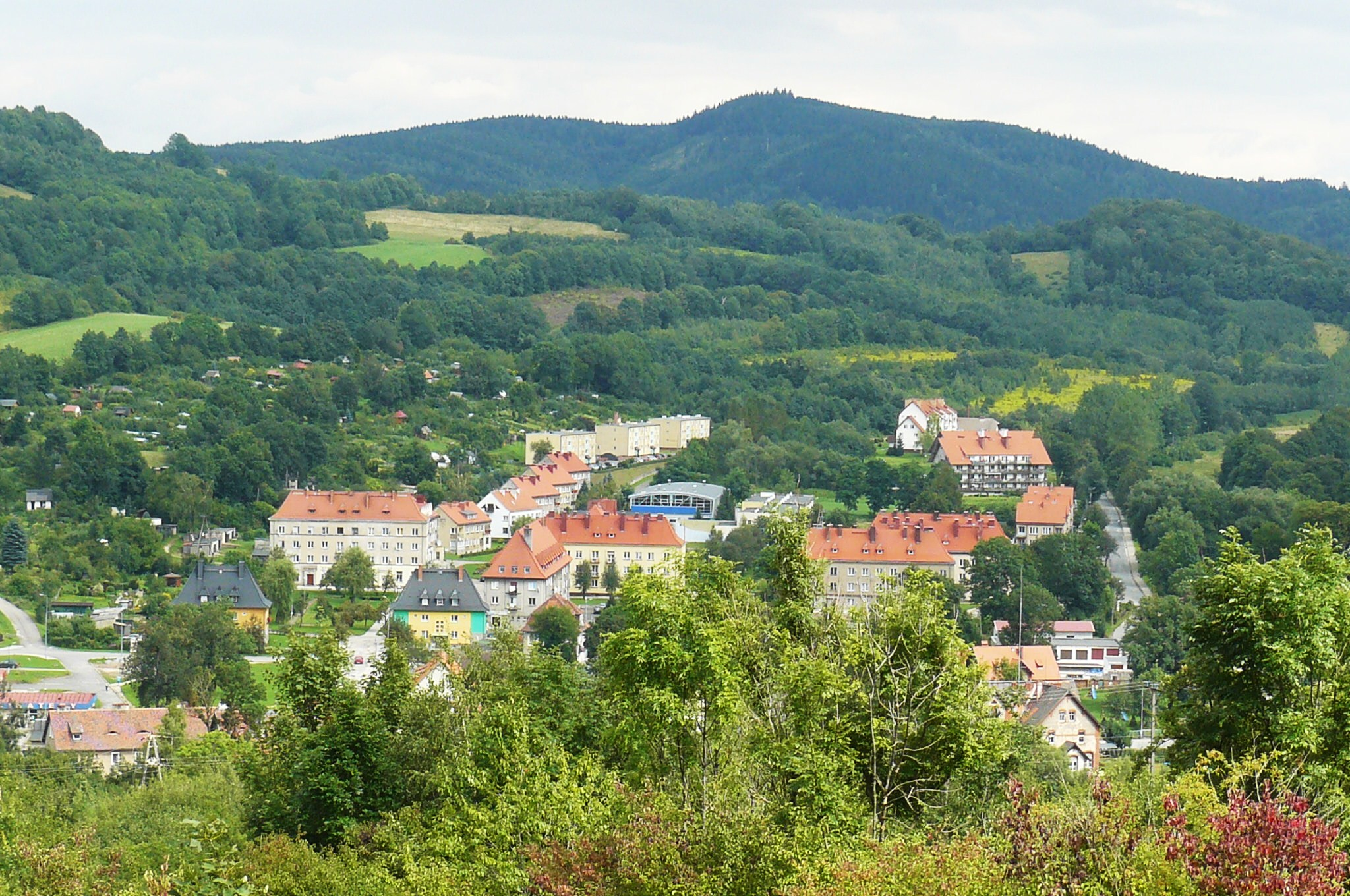

- Coat of arms

- Location within Poland
- Coordinates: 50°57′17″N 15°55′23″E
- Country: Poland
- Voivodeship: Lower Silesian
- County: Złotoryja
- Gmina: Wojcieszów (urban gmina)
- First mentioned: 1268
- Town rights: 1973

Area
  - Total: 32.17 km^{2} (12.42 sq mi)

Population (2019-06-30)
  - Total: 3,668
  - Density: 114.0/km^{2} (295.3/sq mi)
- Time zone: UTC+1 (CET)
  - Summer (DST): UTC+2 (CEST)
- Postal code: 59-550
- Car plates: DZL
- Website: https://www.wojcieszow.pl

Wojcieszów (Polish: [vɔjˈt͡ɕɛʂuf]; German: Kauffung) is a town in Złotoryja County, Lower Silesian Voivodeship, in south-western Poland, close to the Czech border. It is located in the historic region of Lower Silesia.

As of 2019, the town has a population of 3,668.

== History ==
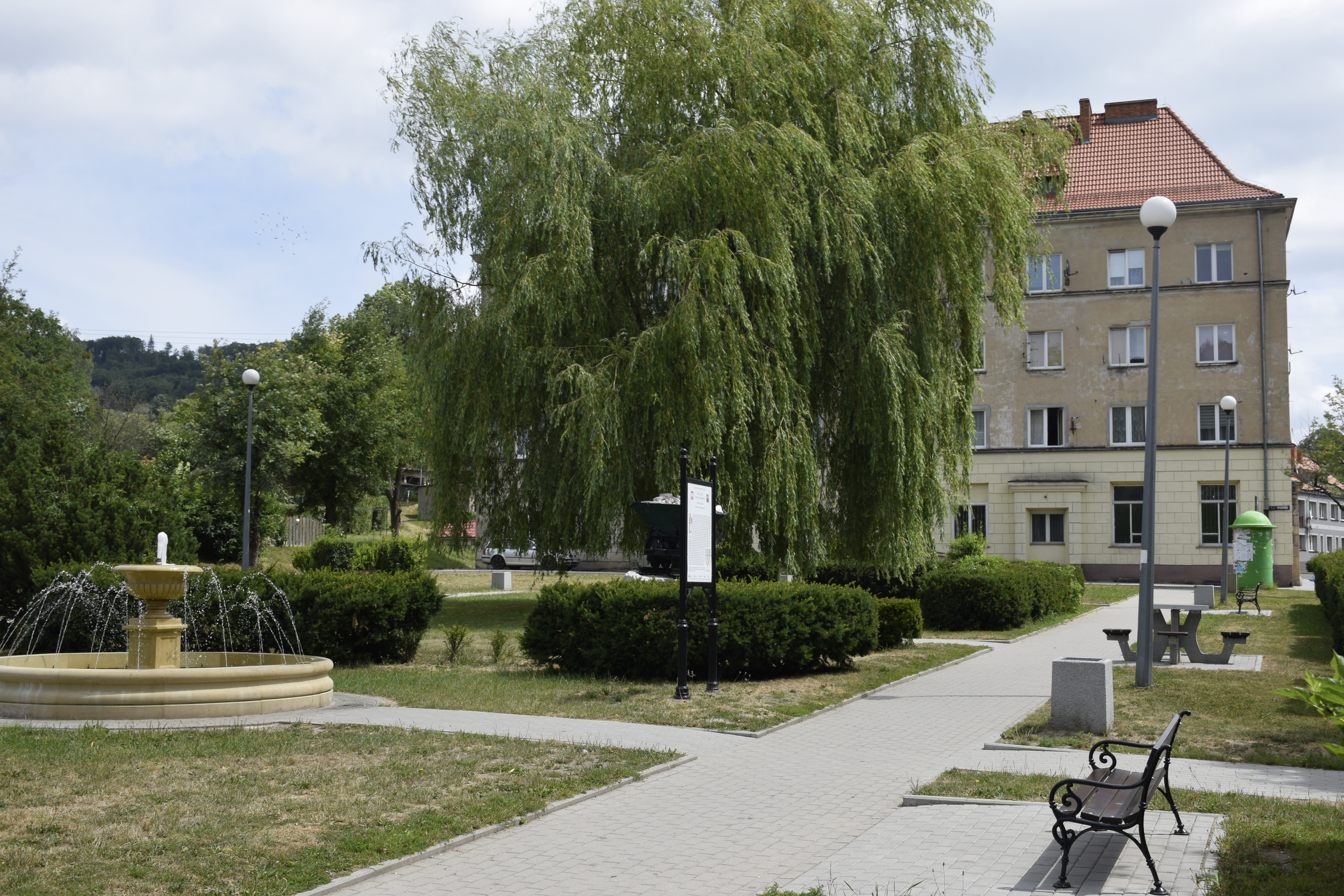
Park in Wojcieszów

The history of Wojcieszów dates back to the Middle Ages, when it was part of the Piast-ruled Kingdom of Poland. Its name comes from the Polish male name Wojciech. The settlement was probably founded in the 12th century, the legend of the Polish knight Wojciesz Paszowic refers to the founding of the settlement. The oldest known mention of Wojcieszów comes from 1268. There was a castle already in the 1367, when it was still under the rule of local Polish dukes of the Piast dynasty. In later periods the settlement was also part of Bohemian Crown, Hungary and Austria.

The settlement suffered during the Thirty Years' War in the 17th century and in 1740 it was annexed by Prussia. It was then known under the Germanized name Kauffung. In 1753 it suffered a fire and during the Napoleonic Wars, French troops were stationed there in 1806–1808. Part of Germany from 1871, during World War II the Germans brought Soviet and French prisoners of war to the town as forced labour. In May 1945 the town was captured by the Soviets, and afterwards it became again part of Poland. It was repopulated by Poles, expelled from former eastern Poland annexed by the Soviet Union, and also those returning from the west.

Wojcieszów was granted town rights in 1973.

== Sights ==
Among the preserved historic architecture of the town are six palaces, ranging from Renaissance to Renaissance Revival and Gothic Revival, and two churches: the Church of the Assumption of the Blessed Virgin Mary, dating back to the 14th century, and the 18th-century Church of Blessed Pier Giorgio Frassati.

== Notable people ==
- Bruno Neidhardt von Gneisenau (1811-1889), Prussian general
- Krystyna Pawłowicz (born 1952), Polish jurist and member of Parliament
- Maciej Maleńczuk (born 1961), Polish rock singer and musician

== Twin towns – sister cities ==
Wojcieszów is twinned with:

- Hostinné, Czech Republic
- Rokytnice nad Jizerou, Czech Republic

== Gallery ==
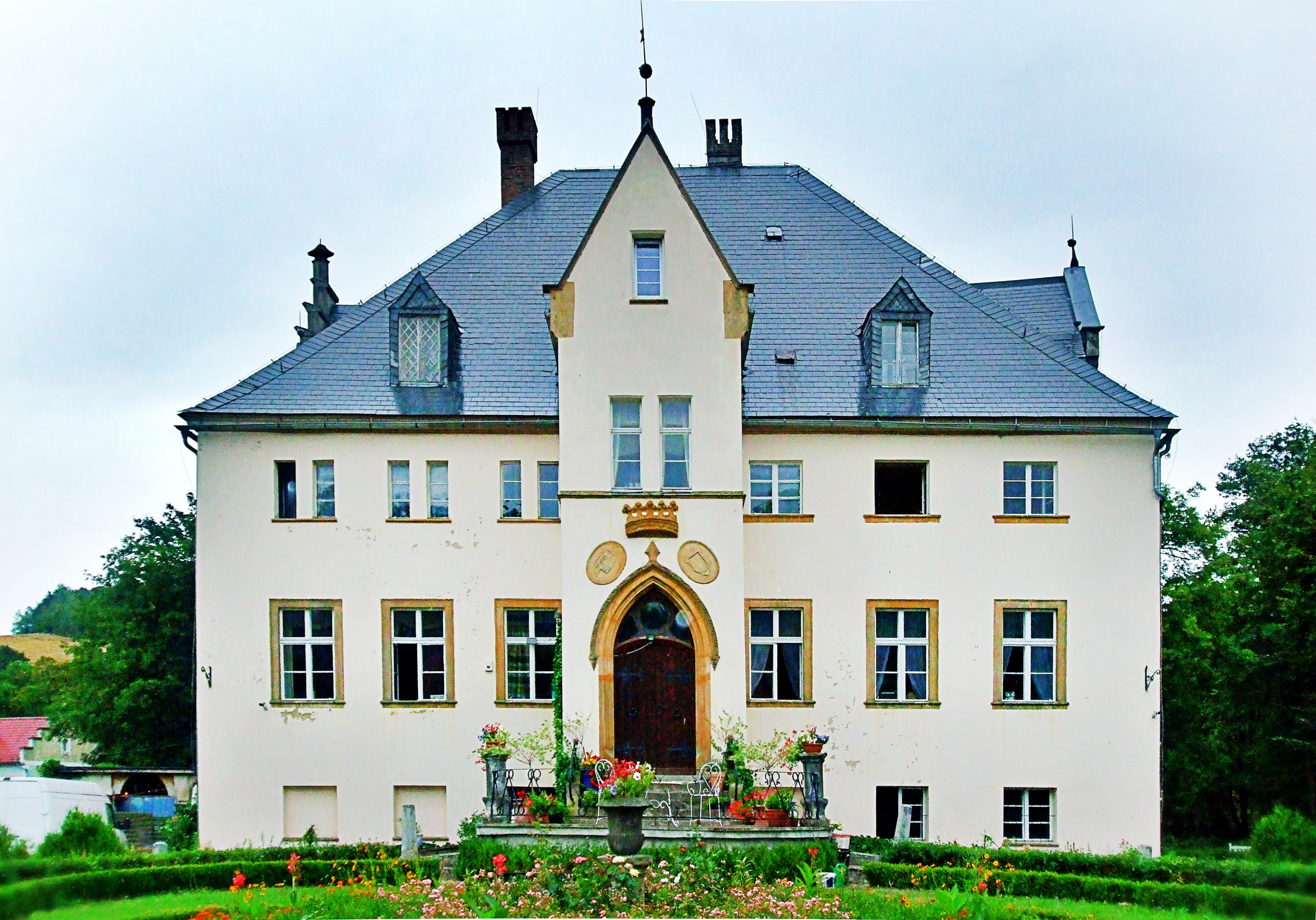
Renaissance Revival Palace in Wojcieszów Dolny

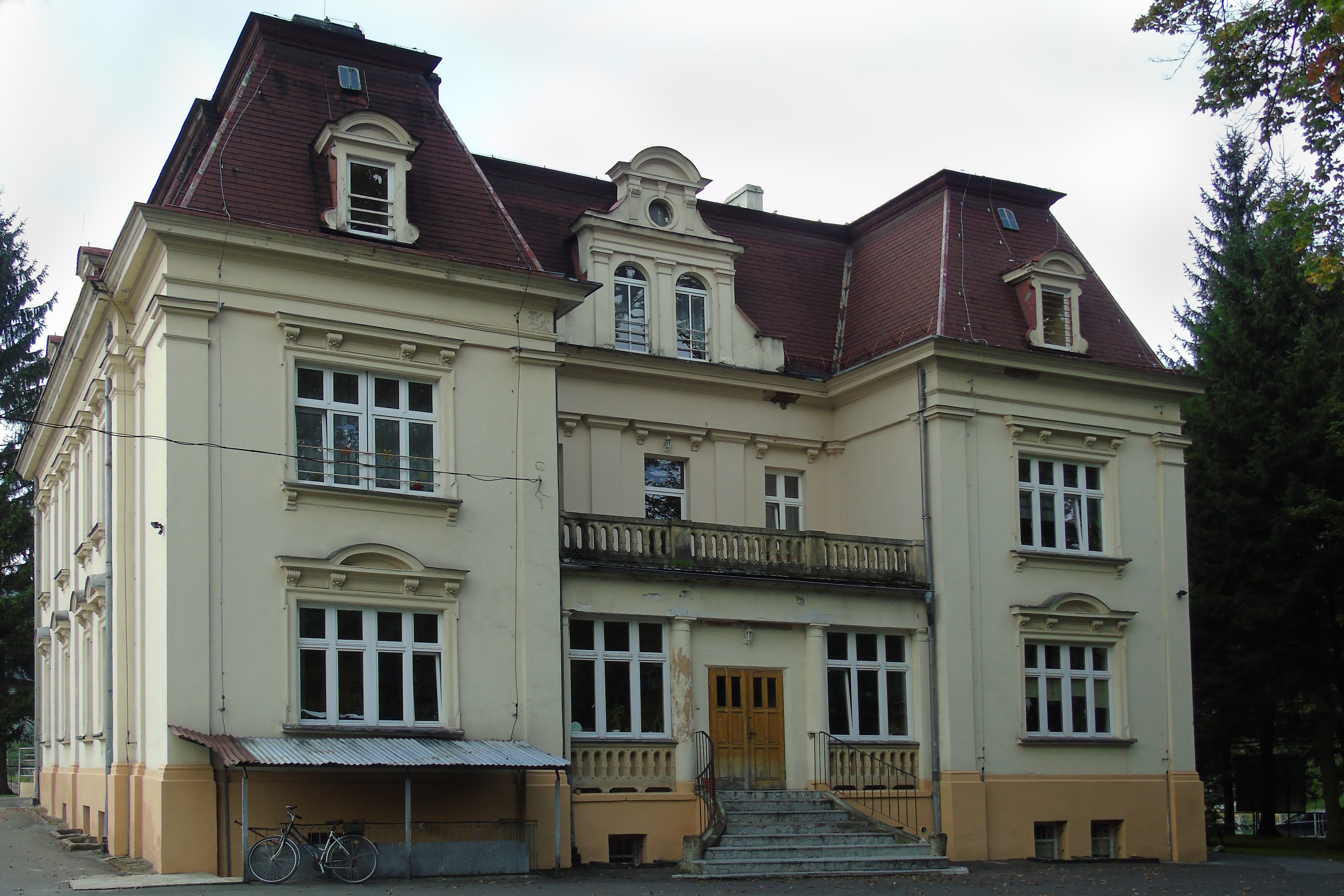
Renaissance Revival Palace in Wojcieszów Dolny

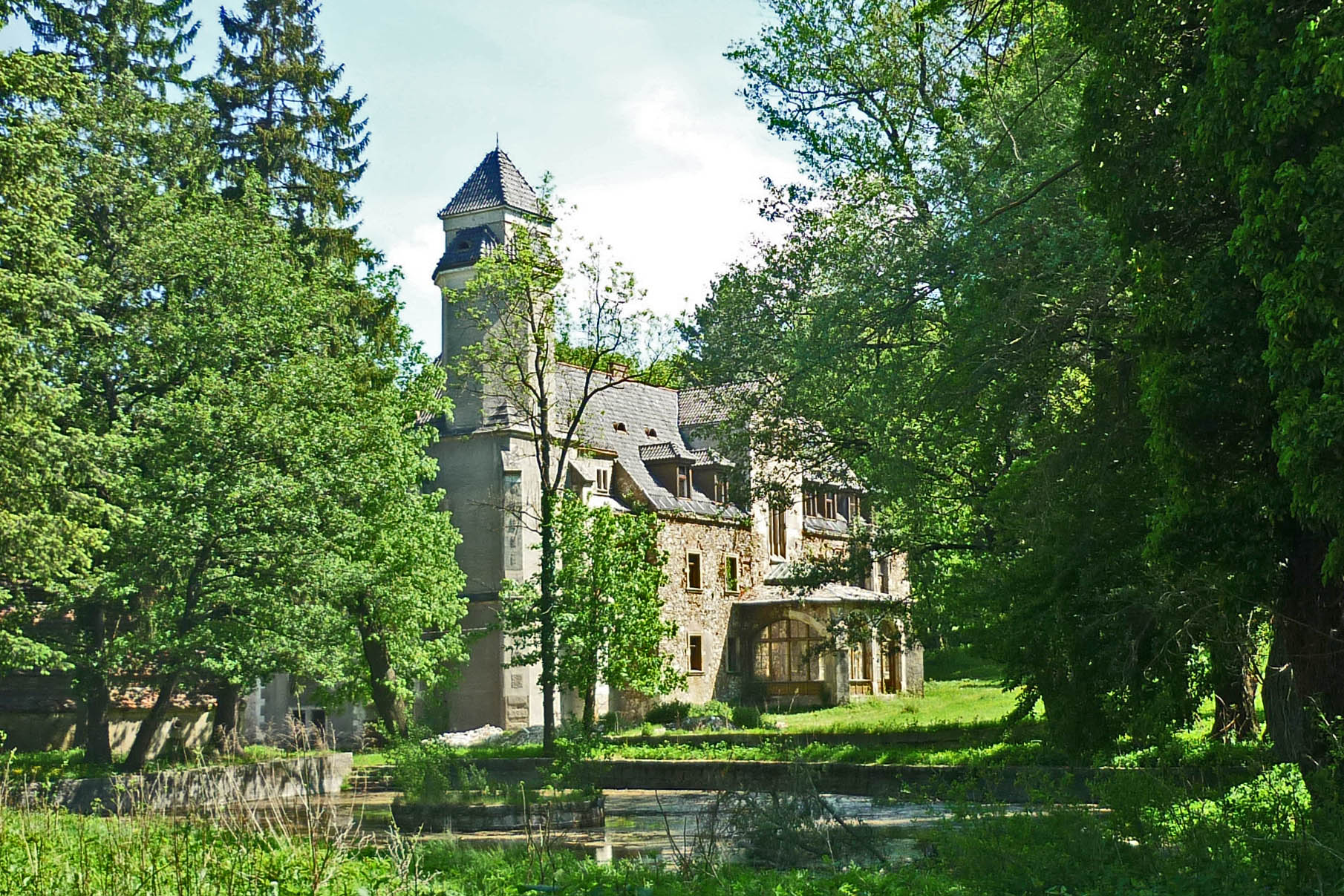
Renaissance Palace in Wojcieszów Górny

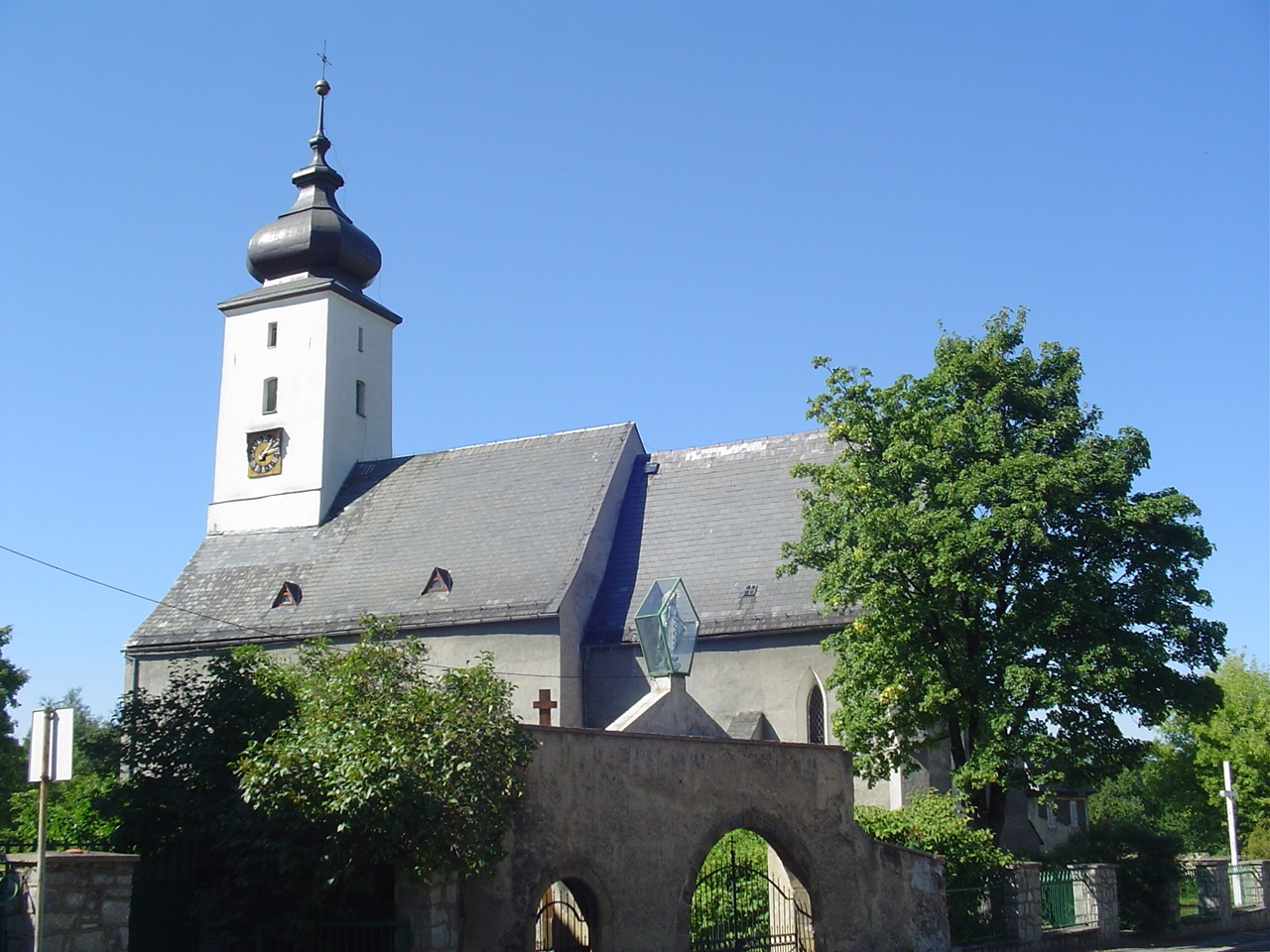
Church of the Assumption of the Blessed Virgin Mary
