= Jaworznia =

- Village
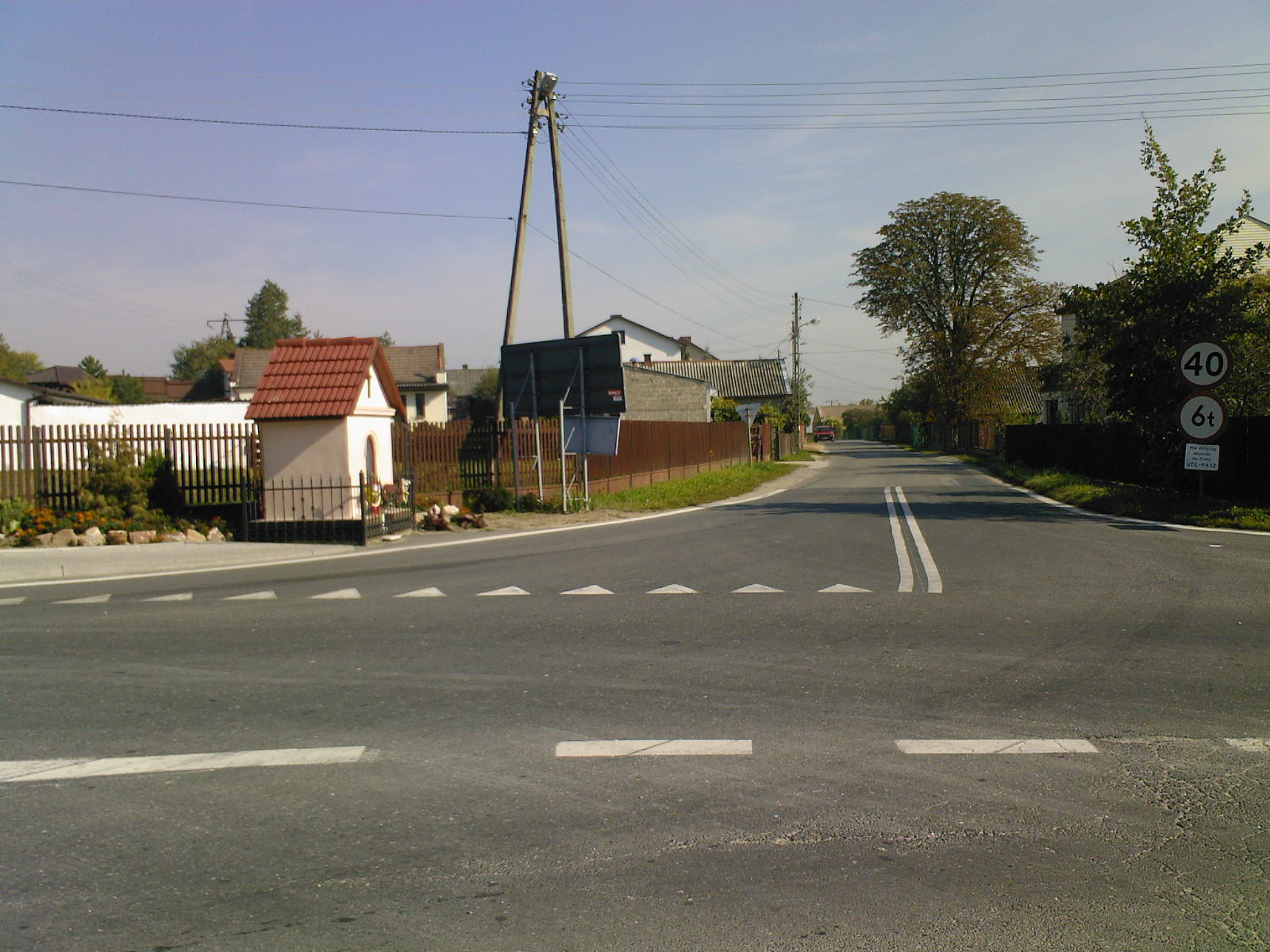

- Location within Poland
- Coordinates: 50°51′50″N 20°29′0″E
- Country: Poland
- Voivodeship: Świętokrzyskie
- County: Kielce
- Gmina: Piekoszów
- Population: 1,100

Jaworznia [jaˈvɔʐɲa] is a village in the administrative district of Gmina Piekoszów, within Kielce County, Świętokrzyskie Voivodeship, in south-central Poland. It lies approximately 3 km (2 mi) south-east of Piekoszów and 10 km (6 mi) west of the regional capital Kielce.
