= Maciej Soboń =

Polish footballer

Personal information
- Full name: Maciej Soboń
- Date of birth: 12 April 1979 (age 47)
- Place of birth: Kłodzko, Poland
- Height: 1.80 m (5 ft 11 in)
- Position: Midfielder

Senior career*
Years	Team	Apps	(Gls)
1996–1999	Chrobry Głogów		
1999–2003	Górnik Polkowice	37+	(1+)
2004	GKS Katowice	0	(0)
2006–2007	Chrobry Głogów		
2007–2011	Górnik Polkowice	49+	(4+)
2011–2013	Chrobry Głogów	25	(0)
- * Club domestic league appearances and goals

Maciej Soboń (born 12 April 1979) is a Polish former professional footballer who played as a midfielder.

== Career ==
=== Club ===
In July 2011, he joined Chrobry Głogów on a two-year contract.

== Honours ==
Górnik Polkowice

- II liga: 2002–03
- III liga Lower Silesia–Lubusz: 2008–09
