= Eduard Tauwitz =

German composer (1812–1894)

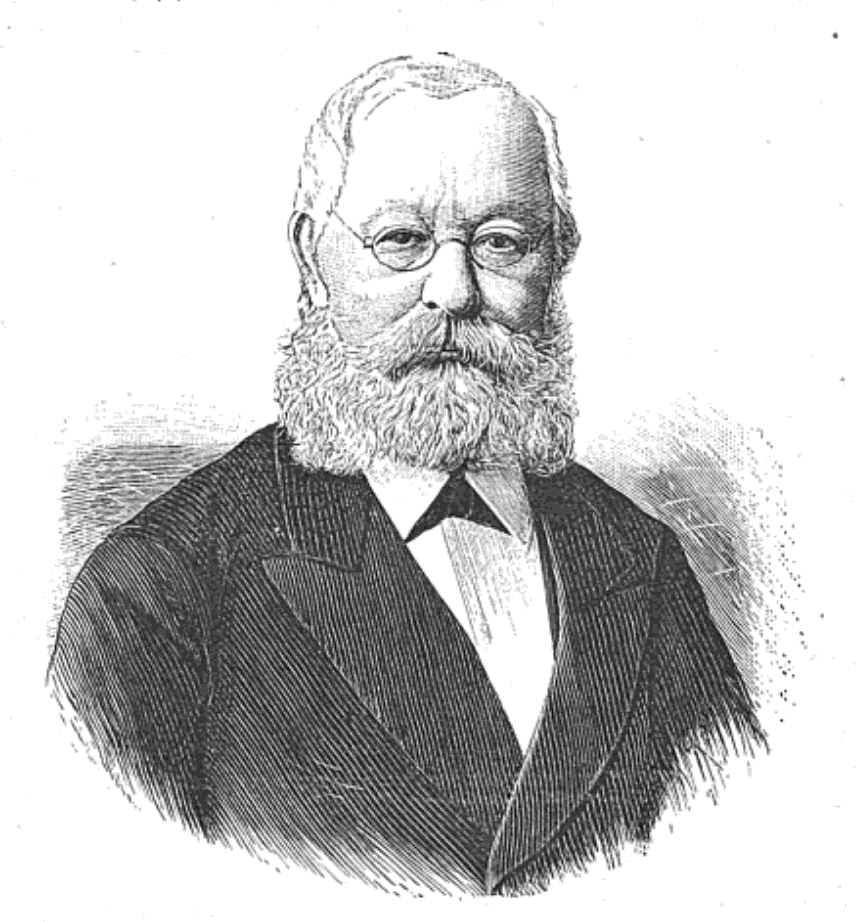
- Portrait engraving of Eduard Tauwitz (c. 1890)
- Born: 21 January 1812; Glatz, Prussian Silesia
- Died: 26 July 1894 (aged 82); Prague, Austria-Hungary
- Burial place: Olšany Cemetery; 50.080556°N 14.470556°E

Eduard Tauwitz (21 January 1812 – 26 July 1894) was a German composer and a native of Glatz, Prussian Silesia.

While studying law at the University of Breslau, he devoted himself to music under the direction of organist Franz Wolf and music director Johann Theodor Mosewius and took charge of the students' choral society (Akademischer Gesangverein). Having decided not to follow a juridical career, he left Breslau in 1837 to direct the orchestra of a theater in Vilnius. In 1840 he went in the same capacity to Riga, but in 1843 returned to Breslau and two years later accepted a similar position in Prague, where he also taught music. After the death of Leopold Zvonař, he succeeded him as the director of the Žofín Academy, a music school for women.

Tauwitz wrote over a thousand compositions, and the following songs are worthy of special mention: Zwölf Soldatenlieder für Vier- und Fünfstimmigen Männergesang and Zweiundzwanzig Banner- und Schwertlieder für Vierstimmigen Männergesang. He also composed three operettas: Schmolke und Bakel, Bradamante and Trilby.

Tauwitz died on 26 July 1894 in Prague, Austria-Hungary, and was buried in the Olšany Cemetery under a white marble tombstone designed by sculptor Ignác Weinrich.
