= Mirosław Pękala =

Polish association football player

Personal information
- Full name: Mirosław Mieczysław Pękala
- Date of birth: 15 October 1961 (age 65)
- Place of birth: Kłodzko, Poland
- Height: 1.77 m (5 ft 10 in)
- Position: Midfielder

Youth career
- Nysa Kłodzko
- Piast Nowa Ruda

Senior career*
Years	Team	Apps	(Gls)
1977–1984	Śląsk Wrocław	137	(24)
1985–1988	Lechia Gdańsk	106	(14)
Total		243	(38)

International career
- Poland U18
- Poland U20
1981–1987	Poland	6	(1)
Medal record
Men's football
Representing Poland
UEFA European Under-18 Championship
Runner-up	1980 East Germany
- * Club domestic league appearances and goals

Mirosław Mieczysław Pękala (born 15 October 1961) is a Polish former professional footballer who played as a midfielder. His playing career lasted 11 years during which time he played for Śląsk Wrocław and Lechia Gdańsk.

== Career ==
Born in Kłodzko, Pękala started playing football for his local team Nysa Kłodzko. He eventually joined Piast Nowa Ruda, being transferred to Śląsk Wrocław at the age of 15.

He made his league debut for Śląsk in August 1977 against Ruch Chorzów at the age of 15, being the youngest ever player to have played for the team. After shining in his early years, his high amount of playing time and early exposure to alcohol abuse took its toll on Pękala's development. During his time with Śląsk he was involved in a night of drinking when he and three other players partied in a T-34 tank outside of a Soviet cemetery. In the winter of 1984 Pękala was involved in a hit and run driving accident, eventually surrendering himself to the authorities. Eventually Śląsk had had enough of the player and his antics and he was transferred to Lechia Gdańsk in early 1985. In total for Śląsk Pękala made 137 league appearances in the I liga.

Pękala made his Lechia debut on 23 March 1985 against ŁKS Łódź. After his initial troubles at Śląsk, Pękala initially had a more structured life and stayed away from alcohol when he joined the club. However Pękala returned to his lifestyle outside of football. One event that took place during his time with Lechia was that a player was sent to find Pękala after a night of drinking, eventually finding him in the 54th house they checked. Despite his antics frustrating the club and management, the manager at the time Wojciech Łazarek saw his importance for the team, with Łazarek saying he'd prefer one Pękala over an additional three players on the pitch. Eventually his drinking habits led to his retirement from football in 1988 at the age of 27, having made 114 appearances and scored 14 goals in all competitions for Lechia.

== International career ==
It is reported that Pękala made nearly 100 appearances for the Polish international youth teams. He made his senior international debut on 25 January 1981 against Japan. In total, he earned six caps for Poland, four of those coming against Japan during an international team tour of the country in 1981, with the other two games coming against Bulgaria and Finland. His only international goal came against Japan.

== Honours ==
Poland U18

- UEFA European Under-18 Championship runner-up: 1980
