= David Origanus =

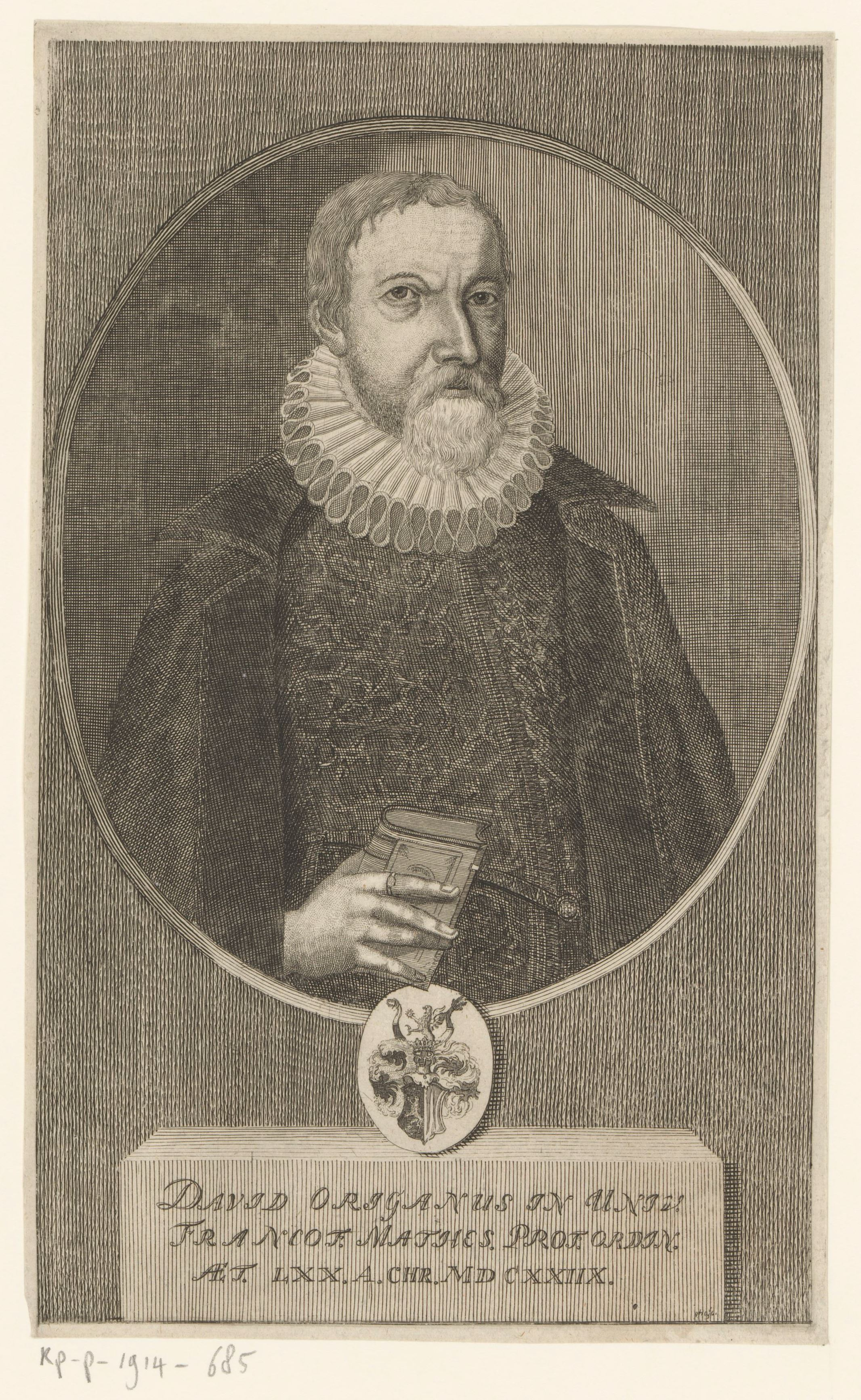
Portrait of David Origanus by Heinrich Jakob Otto.

David Origanus or David Tost (9 July 1558 – 11 July 1628/29) was a German astronomer and professor for Greek language and Mathematics at the Viadrina University in Frankfurt (Oder), where he had also studied.

Tost was born in Glatz (Kladsko), Bohemia (now Kłodzko in southern Poland). During his scientific career he observed numerous comets and published about Ephemeris in 1599 and 1609. In contrast to Tycho Brahe, he was convinced that the Earth rotates. He died in Frankfurt (Oder), aged 71.

== Works ==
- Novae motuum coelestium ephemerides Brandenburgicae, Frankfurt aO: Eichornius, 1609, „Praefatio"
- Ephemerides Novae Annorum XXXVI, Incipientes Ab Anno ... 1595, Quo Joannis Stadii maxime aberrare incipiunt, & desinentes in annum 1630: Quibus praemissa est Introductio Seu Compendiaria Ephemeridum Enarratio ... Eichornius, 1599

== Notes ==
- Siegmund Günther (1887). "David Origanus". Allgemeine Deutsche Biographie (in German). Vol. 24. Leipzig: Duncker & Humblot. p. 422.
