= Kłodzko =

Town in Lower Silesian Voivodeship, Poland

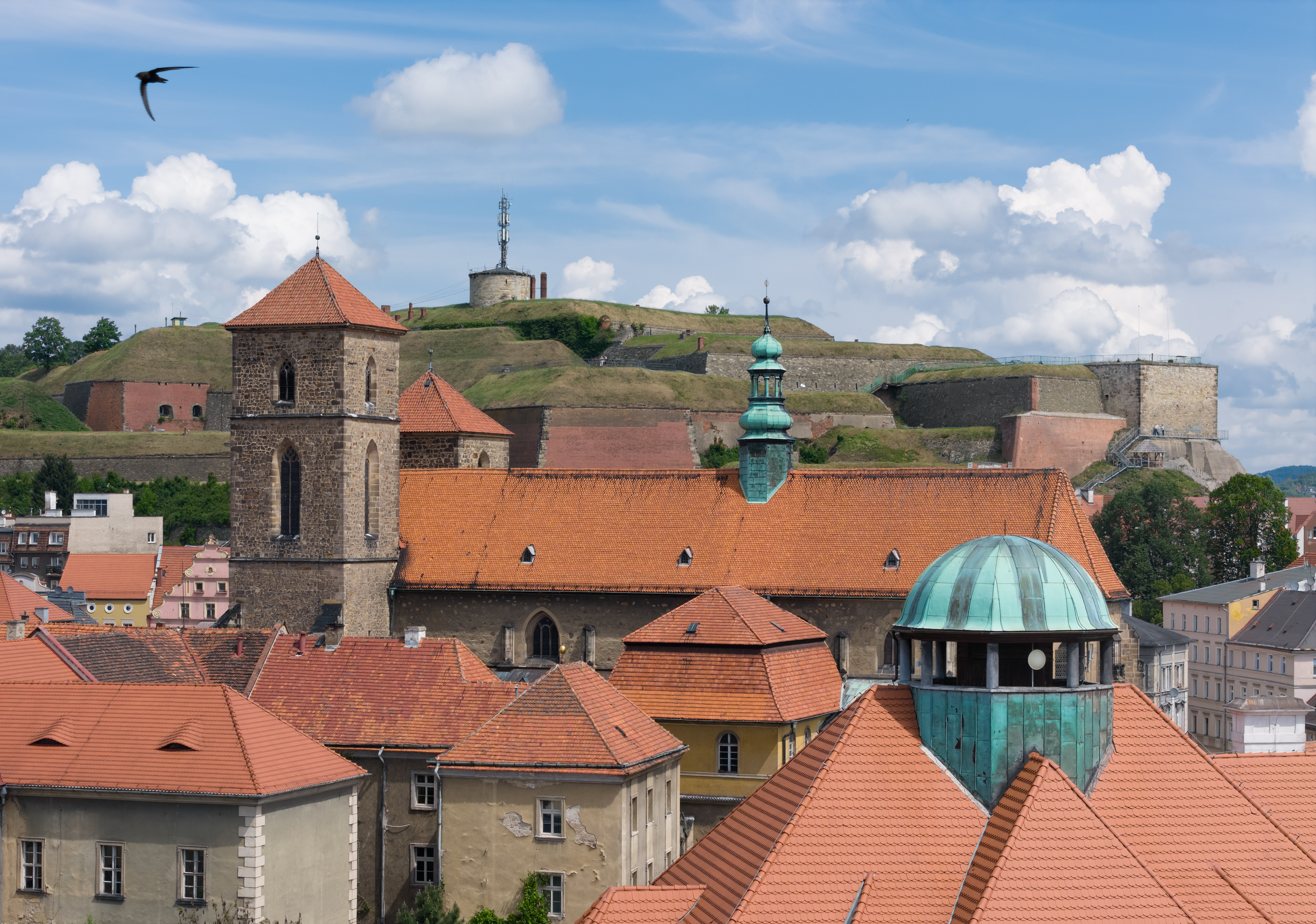
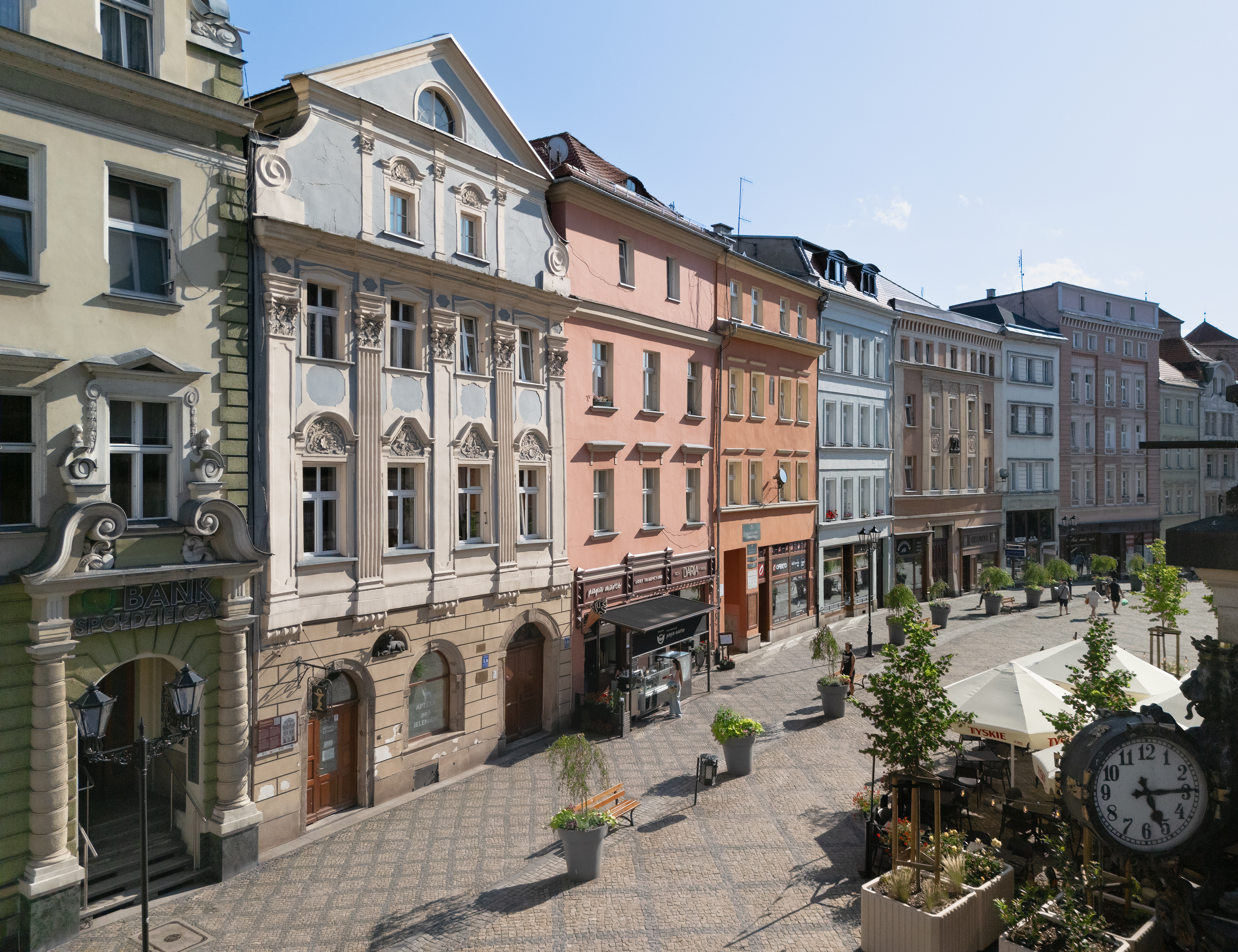
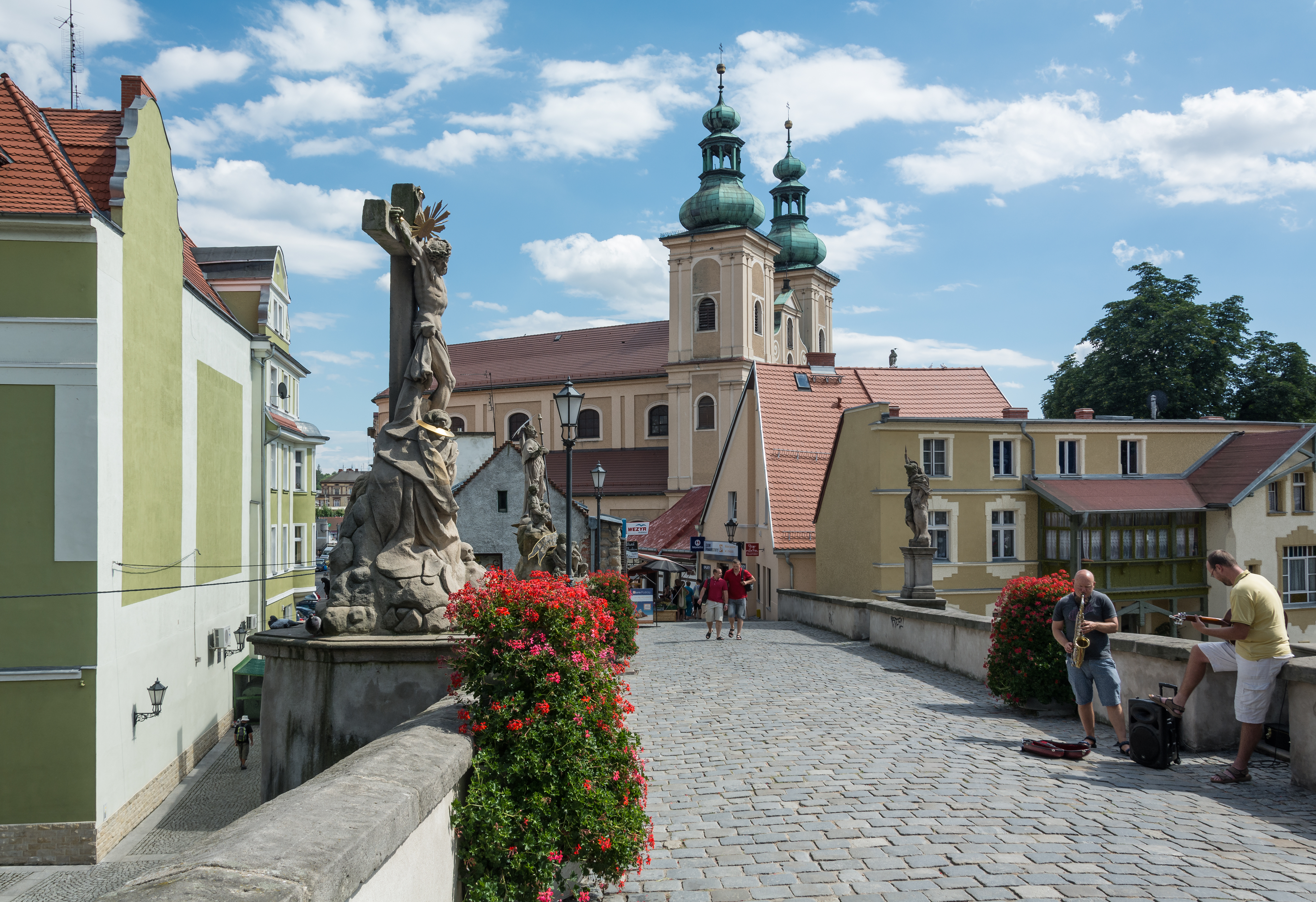
- From top, left to right: Old Town with the Church of the Assumption in the foreground and Kłodzko Fortress in the background, historic townhouses in the Old Town, Gothic bridge and Baroque Church of Our Lady of the Rosary

- Flag Coat of arms
- Nicknames: Luxembourg of the East, Little Prague
- Location within Poland
- Coordinates: 50°26′19″N 16°39′18″E
- Country: Poland
- Voivodeship: Lower Silesian
- County: Kłodzko
- Gmina: Kłodzko (urban gmina)
- Established: 10th century
- Town rights: 1233

Government
  - Mayor: Michał Piszko

Area
  - Total: 25 km^{2} (9.7 sq mi)
- Highest elevation: 370 m (1,210 ft)
- Lowest elevation: 300 m (980 ft)

Population (2021-03-31)
  - Total: 25,717
  - Density: 1,000/km^{2} (2,700/sq mi)
- Time zone: UTC+1 (CET)
  - Summer (DST): UTC+2 (CEST)
- Postal code: 57-300, 57-303, 57-304
- Area code: +48 74
- Car plates: DKL
- Website: klodzko.pl

Kłodzko ([ˈkwɔt͡skɔ]; Czech: Kladsko; German: Glatz) is a historic town in south-western Poland, in the region of Lower Silesia. It is situated in the centre of the Kłodzko Valley, on the Eastern Neisse (Nysa Kłodzka) river.

Kłodzko is the seat of Kłodzko County (and of the rural Gmina Kłodzko, although the town itself is a separate urban gmina), and is situated in Lower Silesian Voivodeship. With 25,717 inhabitants at the 2021 Census, Kłodzko is the main commercial centre as well as an important transport and tourist node for the area.

For its historical monuments it is sometimes referred to as "Little Prague" (Polish: Mała Praga). It was established as a settlement in the 10th century, and is one of the oldest towns in Poland, having been granted city rights in 1233. Culturally and traditionally a part of Bohemia, administratively it has been periodically part of Silesia in the Middle Ages and again permanently since 1763.

== History ==
=== Prehistory ===
The area of present-day Kłodzko has been populated at least since the 1st century BC. There are several archaeological sites both in and around the town that indicate that there must have been a settlement located on the ancient Amber Road that conducted extensive trade relations with the Roman Empire.

=== Medieval Bohemia and Poland ===
The earliest mention of the town is in the 12th-century Chronicle of Bohemians by Cosmas of Prague. He mentions the town of Cladzco as belonging to duke Slavník, father of Adalbert of Prague, in 981. Initially in Bohemia, together with the Kłodzko Land, it changed affiliation several times, passing between Poland and Bohemia in a series of conflicts which in turn devastated the town completely by the beginning of the 12th century. In 1114 Bohemian Duke Soběslav I captured and burnt the town to the ground, but he rebuilt it shortly afterwards. He also rebuilt and strengthened the castle located on a high rock overlooking the town. After the Peace of Kłodzko of 1137, Duke Bolesław III Wrymouth of Poland ceded all claims to the Kłodzko Land to the Bohemian Duchy (later Kingdom).

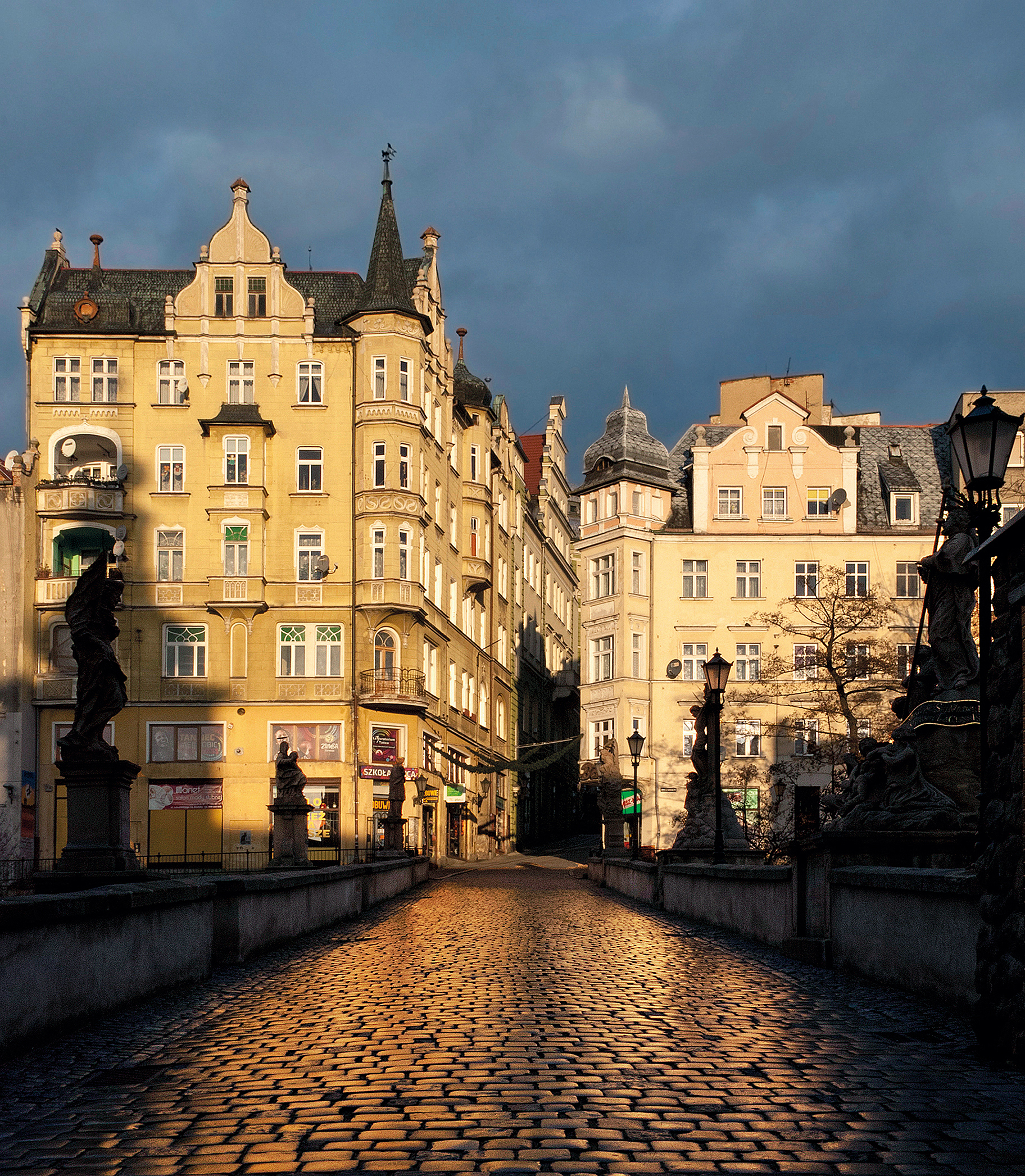
Historical buildings above the medieval-gothic St. John's Bridge

In 1241, Klodzko became the site of a Mongol raid during the Mongol invasion of Europe. However, King Wenceslaus I managed to rally his troops and drove the Mongols out, saving much of Bohemia from Mongol conquest. The town was granted Magdeburg city rights between 1253 and 1278, though the exact date is unknown. In 1278 it came under Polish rule again, as it was taken over by Duke Henry Probus of Wrocław, from 1288 High Duke of Poland, who claimed the entire Bohemian Kingdom after the death of Ottokar II of Bohemia. In 1290 it was sold to the Dukes of Świdnica and then, in 1301, it was sold to the Dukes of Ziębice. However, in 1334, Duke Bolko II of Ziębice sold the town back to the Kingdom of Bohemia. The same year Bohemian king John of Luxembourg, relocated the town, which led to a period of fast growth, bringing German settlers to the town. A city hall was built in 1341, and in the following year a brick factory was opened. From 1366, the town has been protected by a group of professional firemen. The town gained significant profits from its location on the ancient road from Bohemia to Poland through mountain passes in the Sudetes.

German Augustinian monks were invited to the city and, in 1376, most streets were paved with stone setts. The Augustinian abbey became one of the most important centres of culture in the region – for example, in 1399 one of the earliest texts in the Polish language, the St. Florian's Psalter (Psałterz Floriański), was written here. In 1390 a Gothic stone bridge over the Młynówka River (local branch of Eastern Neisse River) was built by the local lord.

=== County seat within Bohemia ===
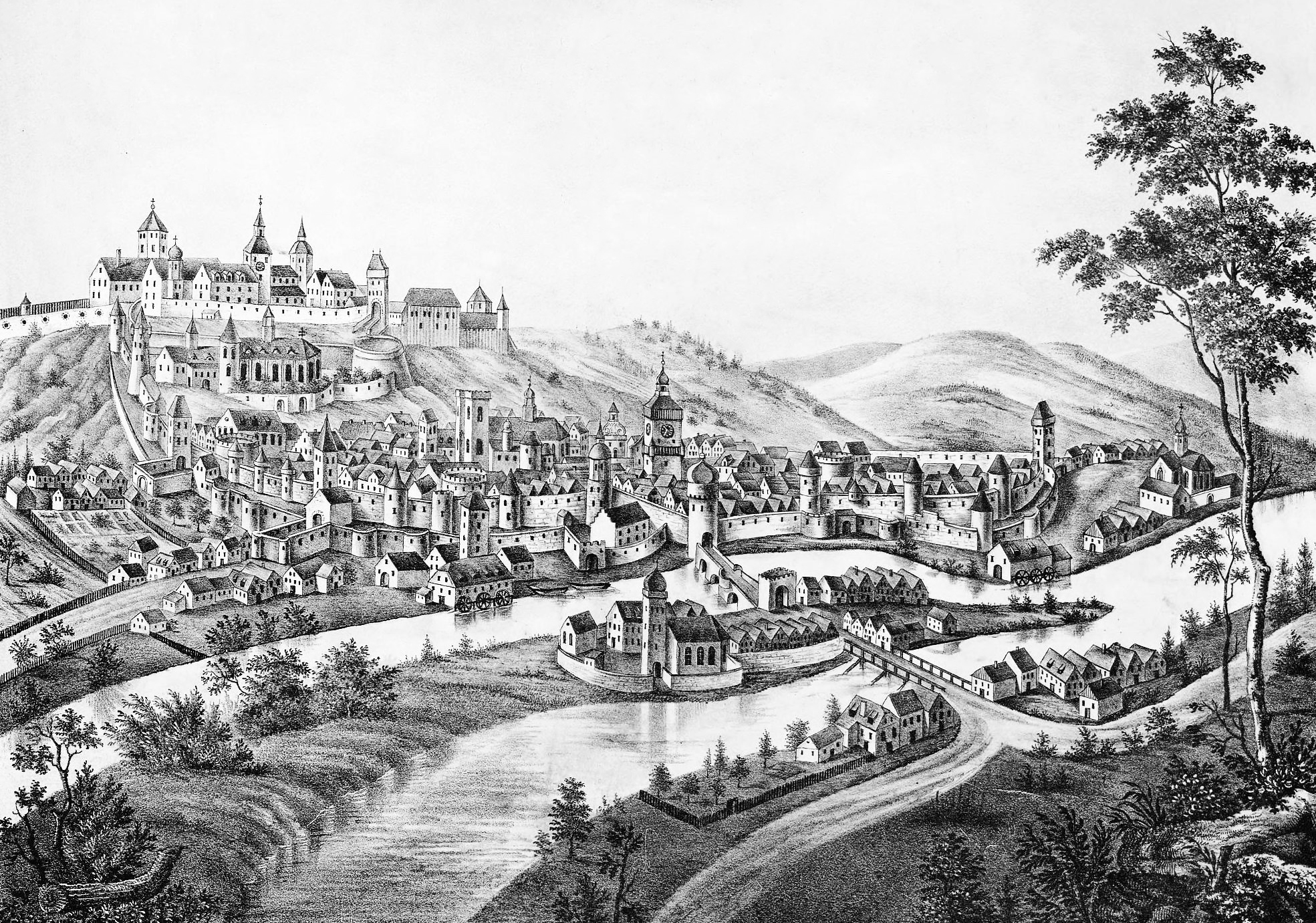
Early modern view of the city

Kladsko developed rapidly until the start of the Hussite Wars in the 15th century. The wars left the town depopulated by plagues, partially burnt, and demolished by several consecutive floods. In 1459 whole Kłodzko Land was elevated by Bohemian king George of Poděbrady to the status of county – thus the city became a seat of Count (for most of time ruler of Bohemia itself) and local Diet – but still remained integral part of Bohemia as "outer region" (Czech: vnější kraj), and was not counted as part of Silesia. In 1472, the Polish prince Vladislaus Jagiellon stayed in the city before his coronation as King of Bohemia in Prague.

In 1526 the Habsburgs succeeded after the Jagiellons as hereditary kings of Bohemia. Thus the County of Kladsko became a part of the Habsburg monarchy; the local counts retained their powers and Bohemian kings (i.e. Habsburg emperors) ruled this land as suzerains. It was not until the 16th century that the local economy began to recover from the previous wars. In 1540 the sewer system was built. In 1549 the remaining streets were paved and the city hall was refurbished. Most of the houses surrounding the town square were rebuilt in a pure Renaissance style.

In 1617 the first census was organised in the County of Kladsko. The city itself had approximately 1,300 houses and over 7,000 inhabitants. However, two years after the census took place the Thirty Years' War started. Between 1619 and 1649 the fortress was besieged several times. Although the fortress was never captured, the city itself was largely destroyed. Over 900 out of 1,300 buildings were destroyed by fire and artillery and the population dropped by more than a half. After the war the Austrian authorities put an end to all local self-government, and the County of Glatz existed in name only. The city was gradually converted into a small garrison town attached to the ever-growing fortress.

=== Kingdom of Prussia ===
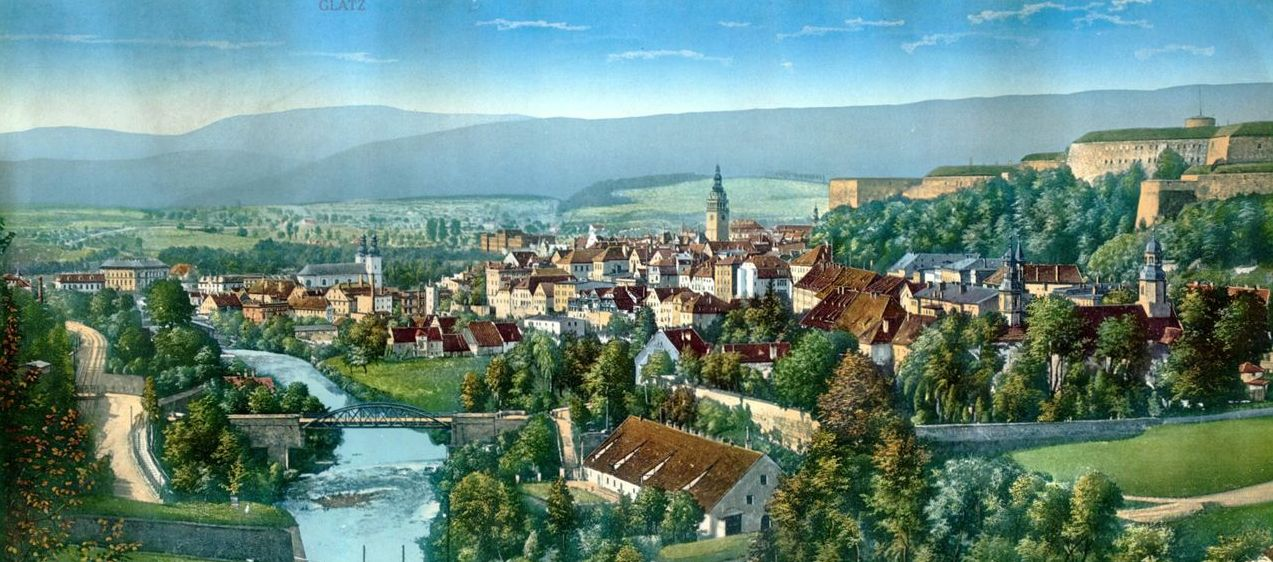
Early 19th-century view of the city

The Kingdom of Prussia annexed Glatz during the 18th century Silesian Wars, although Austrian influence is still evident in the architecture and culture of the region. The construction of the fortress was continued and the town had to bear the costs of the fortress expansion. In 1760 the town was captured by Austrian forces in the Siege of Glatz, but was subsequently returned to Prussia.

Unlike most of Prussian Silesia, Glatz resisted French bombardment during the War of the Fourth Coalition. In 1826, Fryderyk Chopin travelled through the town. During the 19th-century Polish national liberation fights, Polish publicist Włodzimierz Adolf Wolniewicz, Polish historian Wojciech Kętrzyński and Polish priest Augustyn Szamarzewski were imprisoned in the fortress.

=== Germany ===
Glatz became part of the German Empire in 1871 during the Prussian-led unification of Germany. The restrictions in the city's growth were not withdrawn until 1877, after which the town began another period of rapid modernisation and expansion. Some of the forts were demolished, several new bridges were built, and new investments started to arrive in Glatz. The town was connected to the rest of Germany by a railway. In 1864 the gas works were built and in 1880 an electric plant was opened. The buildings along the main streets were rebuilt in Neo-Gothic and Neo-Renaissance style while the city walls with all their gates were demolished. In 1884–1885 a new synagogue was built on the Grünestraße [Green Street], designed by the Breslau architect Albert Grau.

The end of the 19th century saw the Kłodzko Valley turned into one of the most popular tourist regions. Many hotels, sanatoria, and spa were opened to the public in the nearby towns of Bad Reinerz (Duszniki-Zdrój), Habelschwerdt (Bystrzyca Kłodzka), Bad Altheide (Polanica-Zdrój), and Bad Landeck (Lądek-Zdrój). The area of the former county became a popular place among the rich bourgeoisie of Breslau (Wrocław), Berlin, Vienna, and Kraków. In 1910 the city had 17,121 inhabitants: 13,629 Roman Catholics, 3,324 Protestants (mostly members of the Evangelical State Church of Prussia's older Provinces), and 150 Jews.

In September 1938, Glatz was severely damaged by "the flooding of the century", but the damage done was quickly repaired. During the Kristallnacht (9 November 1938), the synagogue was destroyed by an arson attack of Nazis. Most of the Jews emigrated and by 1939 there were only 25 of them left.

==== Czech claims ====
The Kłodzko Valley region on the Eastern Neisse River was the focus of several attempts to reincorporate the area into Czechoslovakia after the First World War even though it had a German majority. From the Czech perspective, Kłodzko and Kłodzko Land are culturally and traditionally a part of Bohemia, although the region has been a part of Lower Silesia since its conquest by the Kingdom of Prussia in 1763. These efforts to incorporate Kłodzko into Czechoslovakia would continue into the period after World War II.

Proposals by the Czechoslovak Delegation on incorporating Kłodzko Land into Czechoslovakia during the Paris Peace Conference, 1919

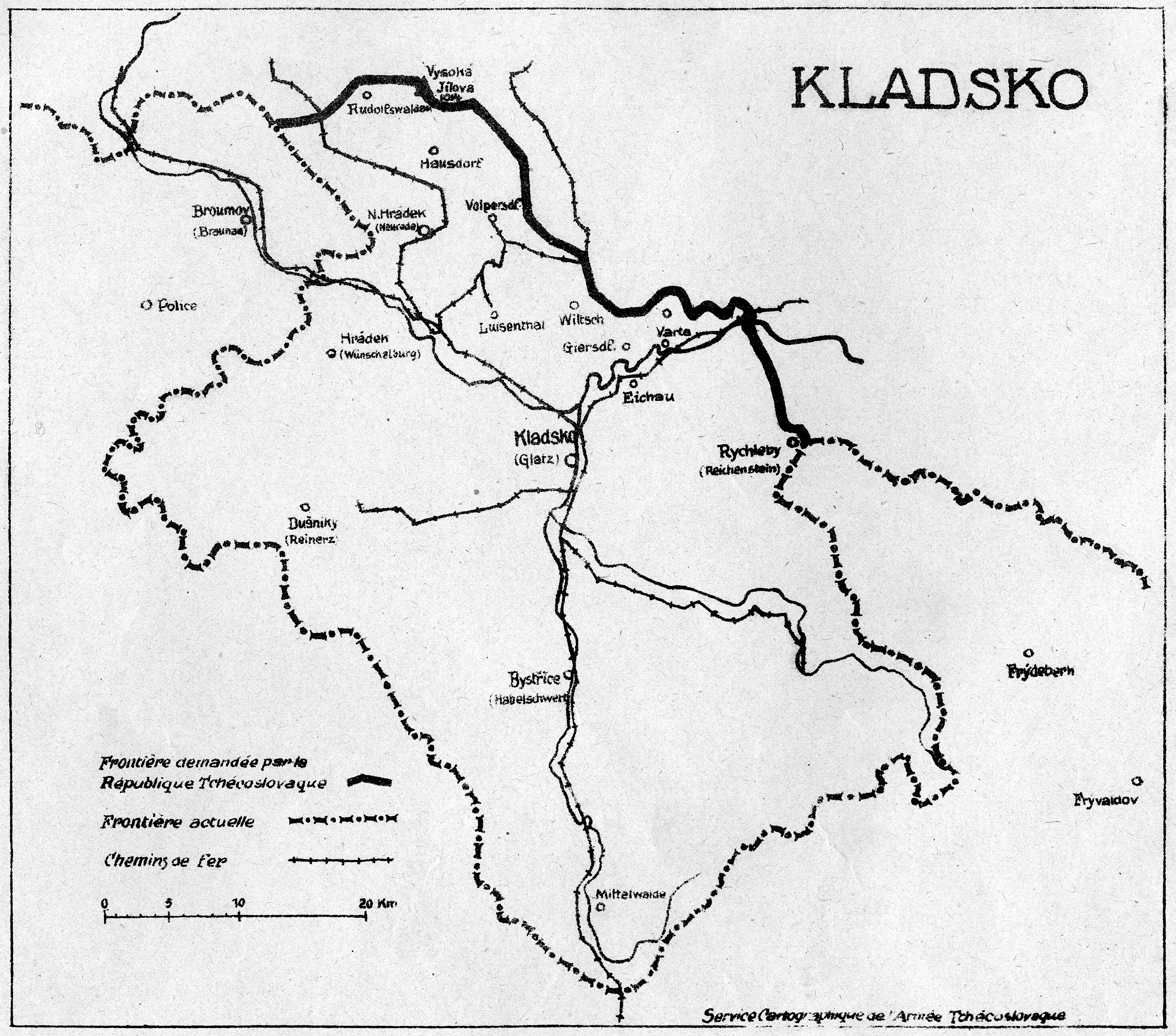
The maximalist variant

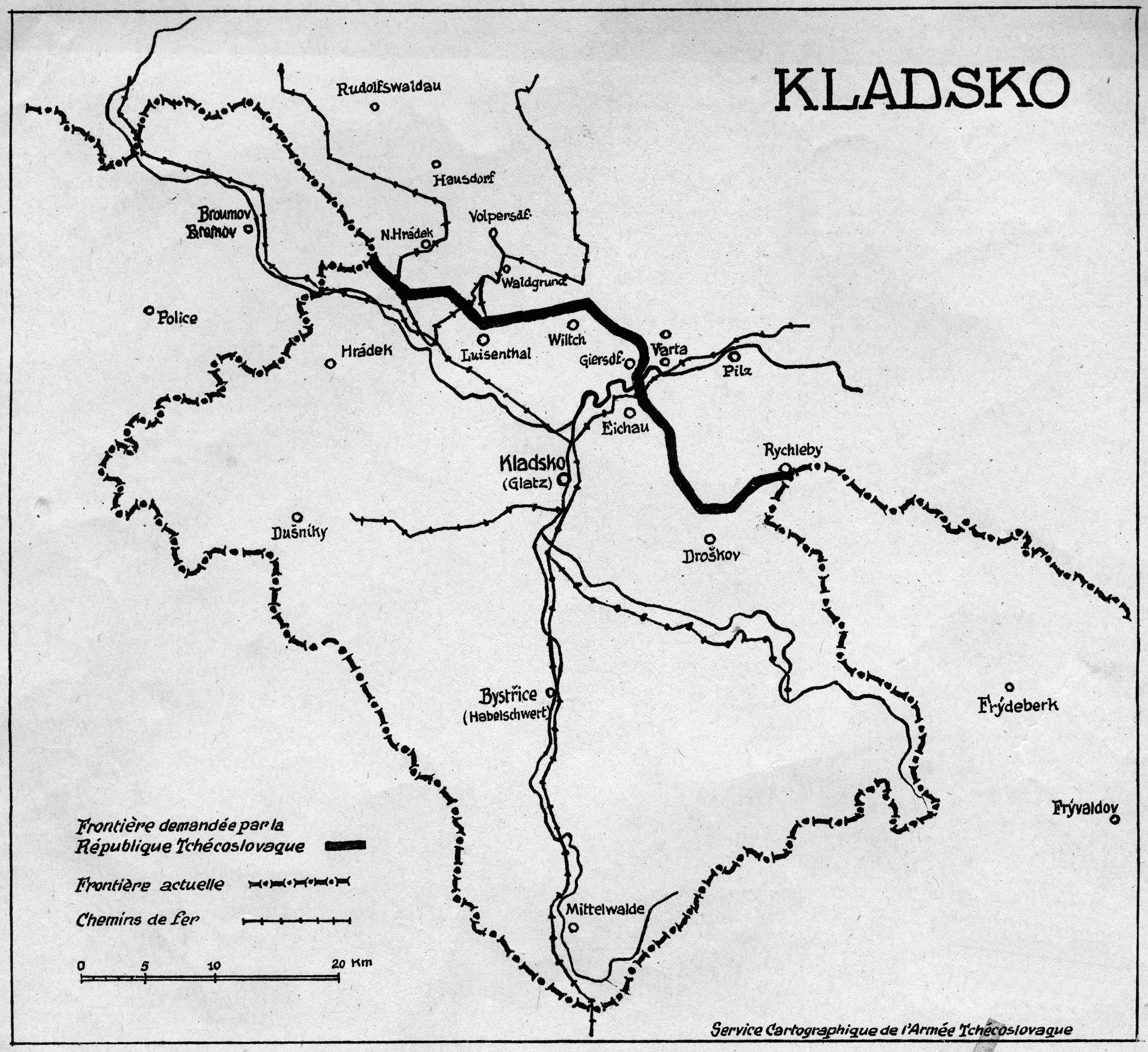
The intermediate variant

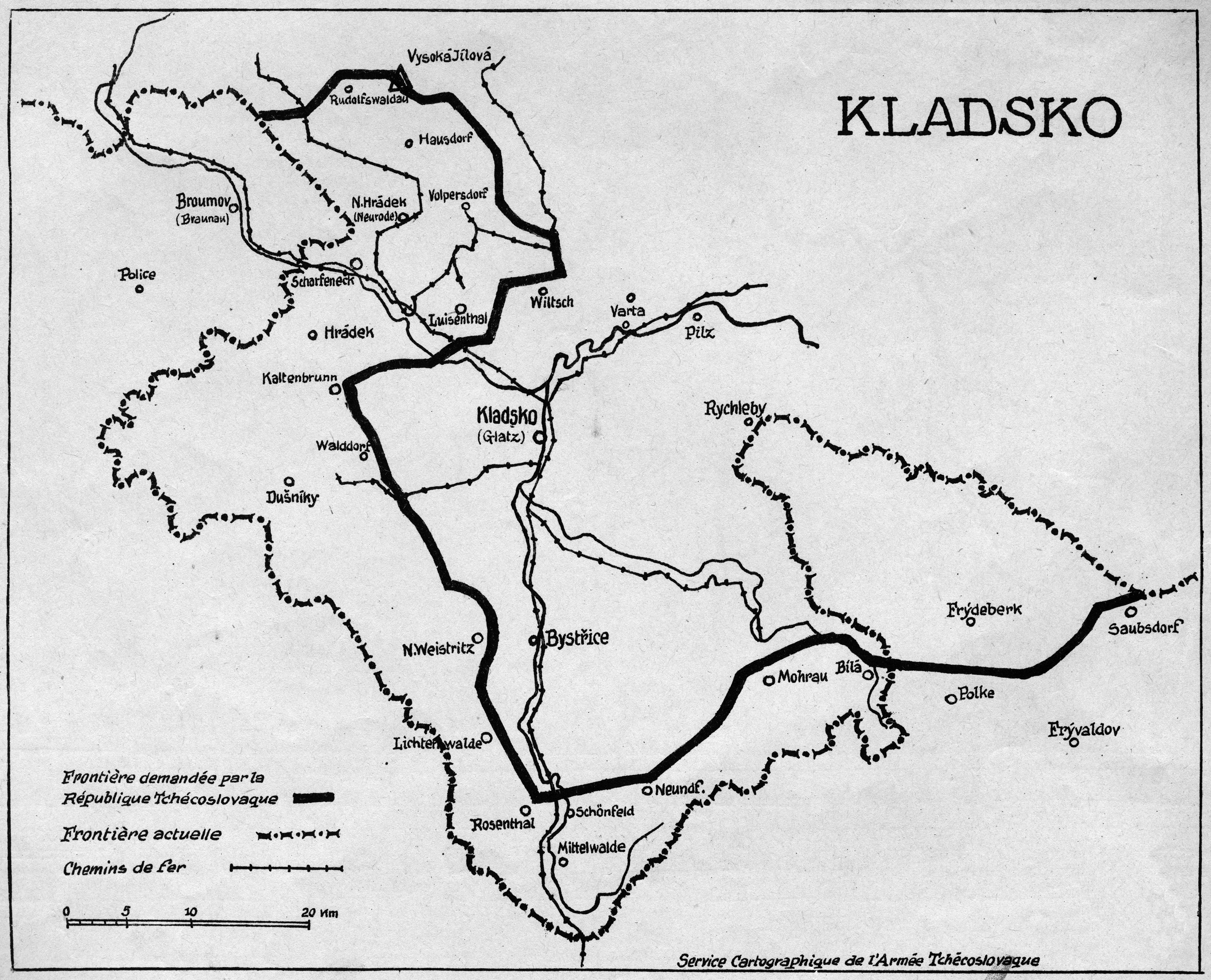
The minimalist variant

==== World War II ====
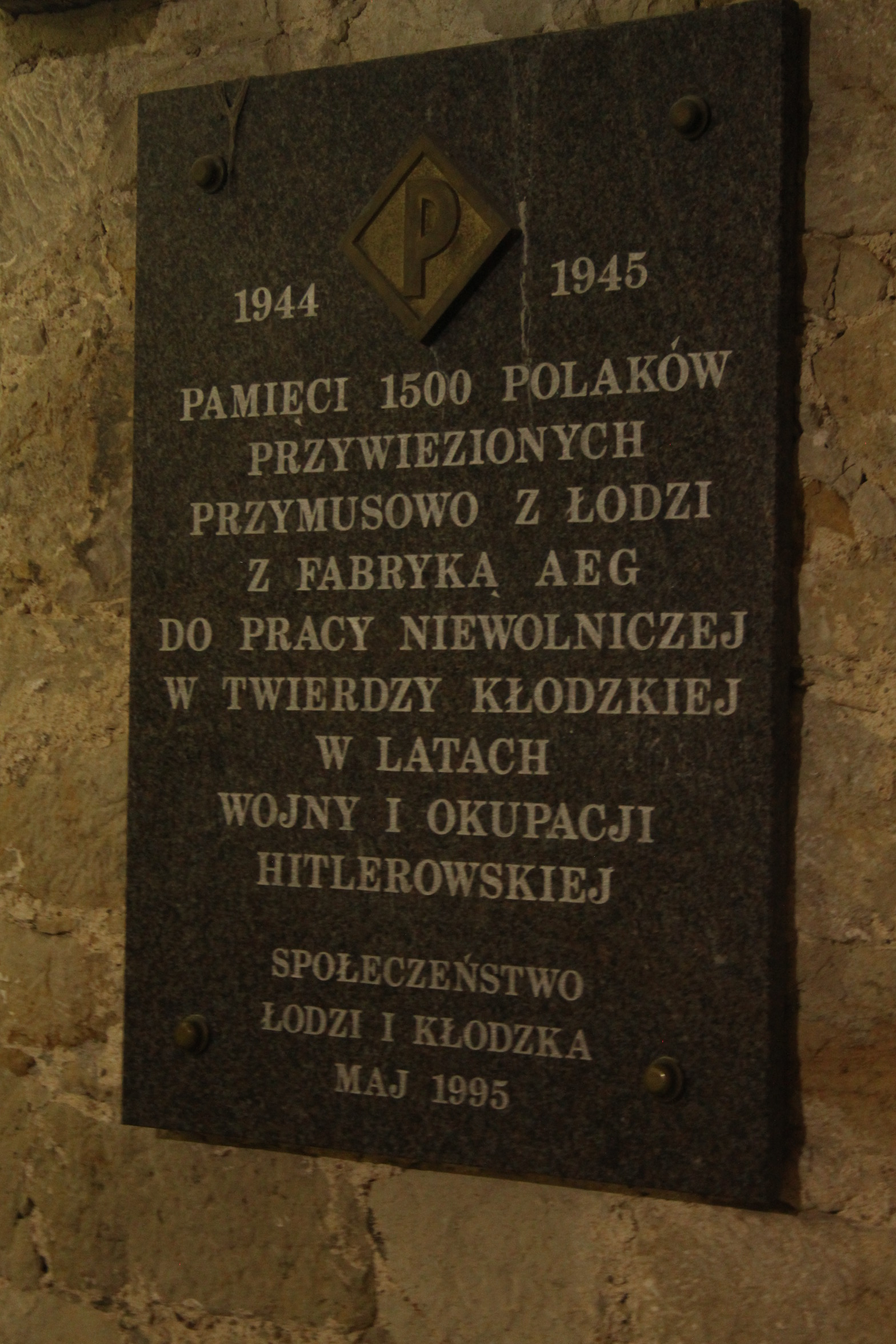
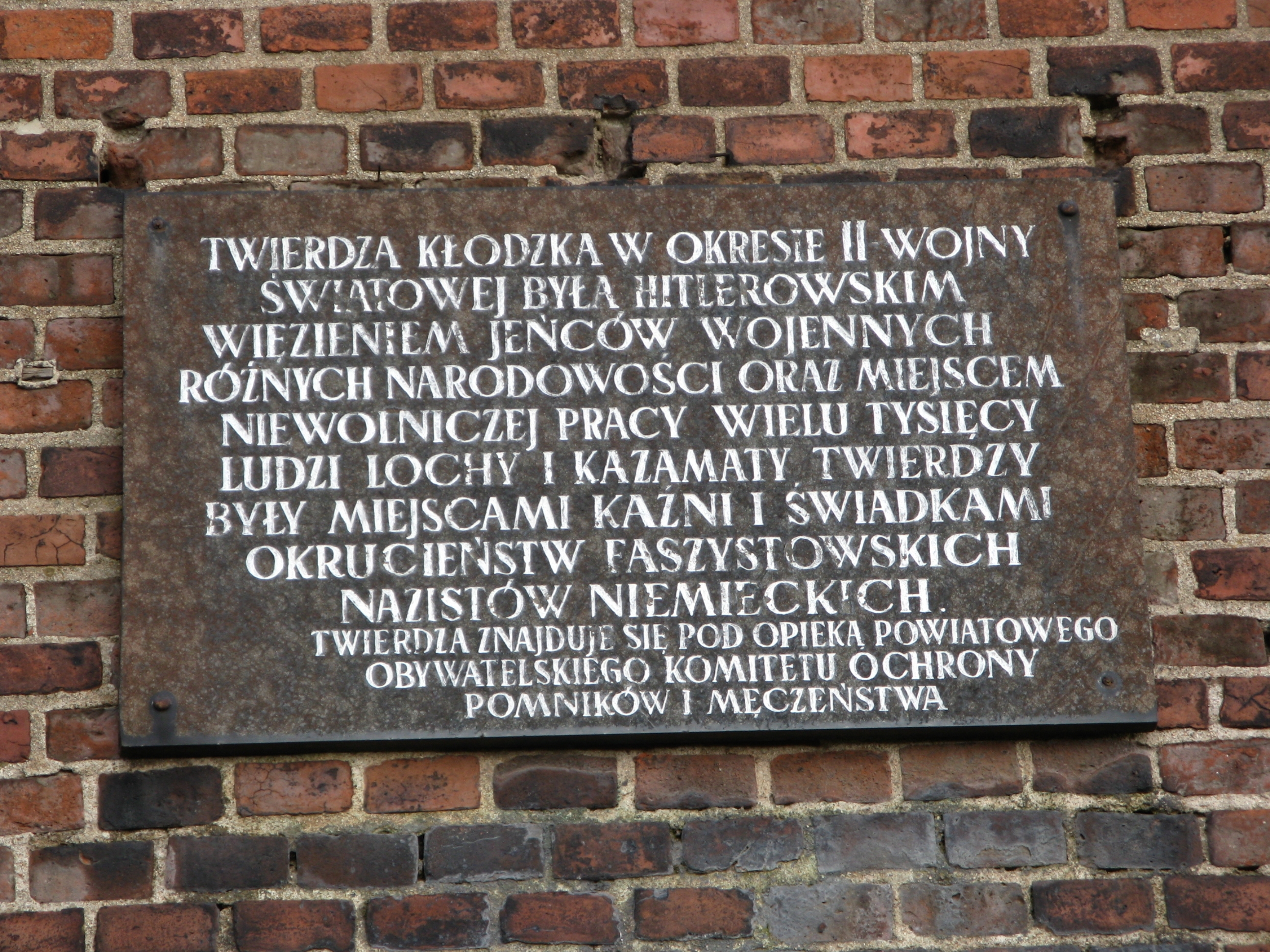
Memorials to Polish forced laborers and Allied POWs held in the fortress by the Germans during World War II

During World War II, the fortress was changed into a prison administered by the Reich Ministry of Justice and Wehrmacht. It housed prisoners of various nationalities, including Allied prisoners of war. In 1941–1942, many prisoners were sent to forced labour in various locations in German-occupied Poland, Czechoslovakia and Austria, and in 1942–1943, six FStGA field penal battalions (1, 7, 10, 13, 16, 20) were established in the town and afterwards relocated to the Eastern Front. In November 1942 and January 1943, the town was the site of a German trial of 39 members of the Związek Orła Białego Polish resistance organization, 18 of which were sentenced to death. 198 prisoners were deported from the prison to various Nazi concentration camps, chiefly Gross-Rosen. Presumably only two men, a Pole and a Russian, managed to escape from the prison (on 23 September 1944). Beginning in 1944, the casemates housed the AEG arms factory evacuated from Łódź, in which some 1,500 Poles were subjected to slave labour. The stronghold was turned into a subcamp of the Gross-Rosen concentration camp. The Germans also established and operated eight forced labour subcamps of the Stalag VIII-B/344 POW camp and two forced labour subcamps of the Stalag VIII-A POW camp in the town.

In January and February 1945, many prisoners from other locations, including Katowice, Racibórz, Brzeg and Nysa, were brought to the local prison either during death marches or transports, and many were then sent further west to Bautzen.<

The town itself was not damaged by the war and was taken over by the Soviet Red Army without a major battle on 9 May 1945. However, all the bridges, except the Gothic stone bridge of 1390, were destroyed.

=== Modern Poland ===
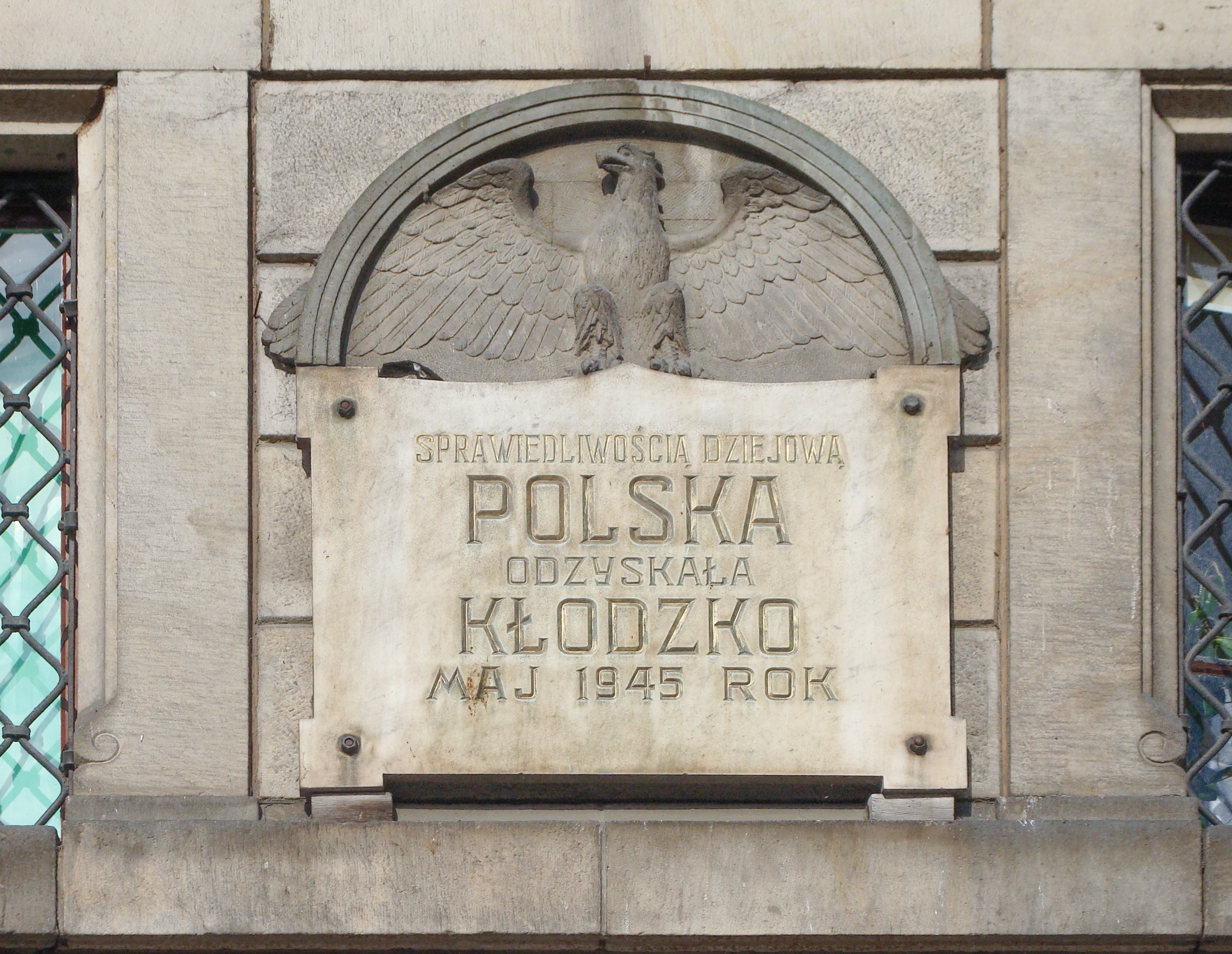
Plaque commemorating the return of Kłodzko to Poland in 1945

After the capitulation of Nazi Germany in 1945, the town became part of Poland under border changes promulgated at the Potsdam Conference, although with a Soviet-installed communist regime, which stayed in power until the Fall of Communism in the 1980s. The Polish took over administration in June 1945. German sources report that oppression immediately began. Germans were deported in February 1946, in accordance to the Potsdam Agreement. The town was repopulated by Poles, some of whom were Polish refugees from former eastern Polish territories annexed by the Soviet Union, from where they had been displaced by Soviet authorities in accordance to new borders decreed at Yalta Conference, while most came from war-devastated central Poland. In May 1945 Czechoslovakia tried to annex the area on behalf of Czech minority (living especially in the western part of the land, called "Czech Corner") and historical claims, but under pressure from the Soviet Union the Czech minority was expelled to Czechoslovakia.

In the following years, the Polish anti-communist resistance was active in Kłodzko, including the nationwide Home Army-NIE-Freedom and Independence Association and 12 local youth organizations.

On 20 August 1946, the town was struck by a large tornado, rated by the European Severe Storms Laboratory (ESSL) to have been F2–F4 intensity on the Fujita scale. The ESSL documented the path length of the tornado at 10 kilometres (6.2 mi) with a maximum width of 1,000 metres (1,100 yd) and noted, "to less information to" assign a solid rating for the tornado.

In the 1950s and 1960s much of the town centre was damaged by landslides. It turned out that throughout the city's history, generations of Kłodzko's merchants had developed an extensive net of underground basements and tunnels. They were used for storage and, in times of trouble, as a safe shelter from artillery fire. With time the tunnels were forgotten, especially after the original German population was deported, and during the years after World War II many of them started to collapse, along with the houses above. Since the 1970s the tunnels were conserved and the destruction of the city was stopped. Another disaster happened in 1997, when the city was damaged by flooding even greater than that of 1938. However, the town quickly recovered. The town was badly affected by the 2024 Central European floods.

On 28 June 1972, the Catholic parishes of Kłodzko were redeployed from the traditional Hradec Králové diocese (est. 1664; Ecclesiastical province of Bohemia) into the Archdiocese of Wrocław. From 1975 to 1998 Kłodzko was administratively part of the former Wałbrzych Voivodeship.

Currently, Kłodzko is one of centres of culture, commerce and tourism in Lower Silesia.

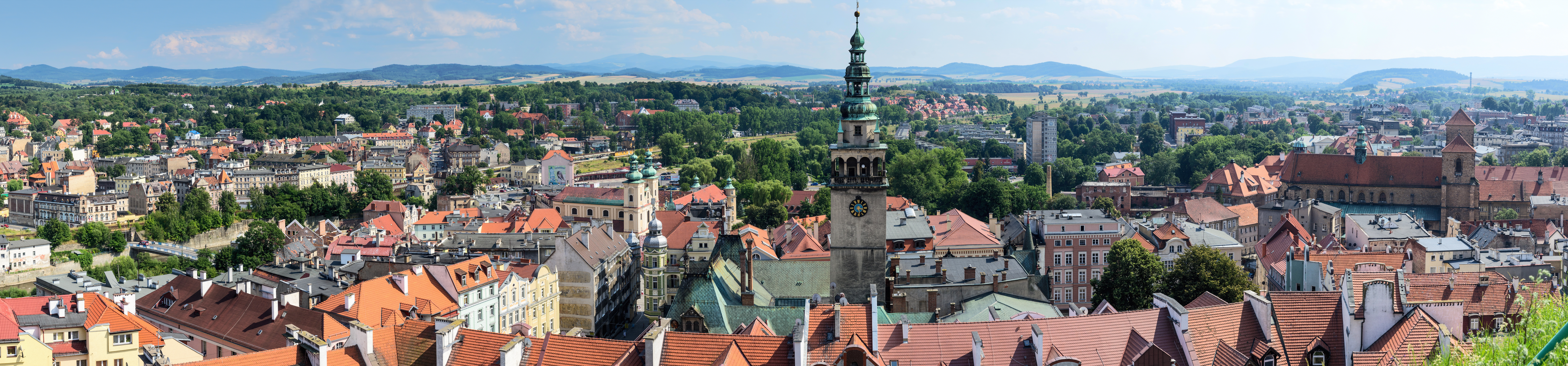
Panorama of Kłodzko

== Climate ==
The climate is semicontinental although officially it is considered as oceanic (Köppen: Cfb), near of the humid continental (Dfb), considered as such by the isotherm of 0 °C. Located in western Poland where there is the clash of marine air masses and the interior of Siberia, they collide and generate a highly variable climate, although the patterns of the west are predominant.

Climate data for Kłodzko, elevation: 320 m, (1991–2020 normals, extremes 1951–present)
Month	Jan	Feb	Mar	Apr	May	Jun	Jul	Aug	Sep	Oct	Nov	Dec	Year
Record high °C (°F)	16.3 (61.3)	18.6 (65.5)	23.0 (73.4)	27.9 (82.2)	31.7 (89.1)	32.4 (90.3)	34.8 (94.6)	37.5 (99.5)	33.9 (93.0)	24.8 (76.6)	18.5 (65.3)	17.0 (62.6)	35.1 (95.2)
Mean daily maximum °C (°F)	1.2 (34.2)	2.9 (37.2)	7.3 (45.1)	13.8 (56.8)	18.2 (64.8)	21.5 (70.7)	23.8 (74.8)	23.9 (75.0)	18.4 (65.1)	12.7 (54.9)	6.8 (44.2)	2.2 (36.0)	12.7 (54.9)
Daily mean °C (°F)	−1.6 (29.1)	−0.5 (31.1)	2.9 (37.2)	8.1 (46.6)	12.5 (54.5)	15.9 (60.6)	17.7 (63.9)	17.6 (63.7)	13.0 (55.4)	8.4 (47.1)	3.9 (39.0)	−0.3 (31.5)	8.1 (46.6)
Mean daily minimum °C (°F)	−4.4 (24.1)	−3.6 (25.5)	−0.8 (30.6)	2.6 (36.7)	6.8 (44.2)	10.3 (50.5)	11.9 (53.4)	11.5 (52.7)	8.2 (46.8)	4.8 (40.6)	1.3 (34.3)	−2.9 (26.8)	3.8 (38.8)
Record low °C (°F)	−29.7 (−21.5)	−28.8 (−19.8)	−26.9 (−16.4)	−10.2 (13.6)	−4.1 (24.6)	−0.5 (31.1)	2.6 (36.7)	0.8 (33.4)	−4.1 (24.6)	−7.6 (18.3)	−19.3 (−2.7)	−28.1 (−18.6)	−29.7 (−21.5)
Average precipitation mm (inches)	24.3 (0.96)	24.6 (0.97)	35.6 (1.40)	37.3 (1.47)	67.9 (2.67)	83.7 (3.30)	97.3 (3.83)	72.8 (2.87)	59.2 (2.33)	41.8 (1.65)	30.7 (1.21)	26.1 (1.03)	601.2 (23.67)
Average extreme snow depth cm (inches)	6.2 (2.4)	7.0 (2.8)	5.2 (2.0)	1.8 (0.7)	0.2 (0.1)	0.0 (0.0)	0.0 (0.0)	0.0 (0.0)	0.0 (0.0)	0.3 (0.1)	2.7 (1.1)	3.9 (1.5)	7.0 (2.8)
Average precipitation days (≥ 0.1 mm)	15.27	13.37	15.37	11.23	14.20	13.97	14.73	12.13	12.57	13.83	13.50	14.83	165.00
Average snowy days (≥ 0 cm)	17.7	14.5	7.4	1.4	0.0	0.0	0.0	0.0	0.0	0.2	4.0	11.8	57.0
Average relative humidity (%)	85.5	82.6	78.8	72.2	74.9	76.5	75.7	75.2	80.2	83.4	86.3	86.6	79.8
Mean monthly sunshine hours	53.8	79.6	123.7	188.5	228.1	226.1	239.1	232.2	155.8	108.3	59.6	45.6	1,740.6
Source 1: Institute of Meteorology and Water Management
Source 2: Meteomodel.pl (records, relative humidity 1991–2020)

Climate data for Kłodzko (Szalejów Dolny), elevation: 356 m, 1961-1990 normals and extremes
Month	Jan	Feb	Mar	Apr	May	Jun	Jul	Aug	Sep	Oct	Nov	Dec	Year
Record high °C (°F)	10.4 (50.7)	17.2 (63.0)	23.0 (73.4)	27.8 (82.0)	31.7 (89.1)	32.4 (90.3)	34.8 (94.6)	32.5 (90.5)	30.7 (87.3)	24.1 (75.4)	17.4 (63.3)	17.0 (62.6)	34.8 (94.6)
Mean daily maximum °C (°F)	0.0 (32.0)	1.9 (35.4)	6.4 (43.5)	12.2 (54.0)	17.4 (63.3)	20.5 (68.9)	22.0 (71.6)	21.9 (71.4)	18.1 (64.6)	12.9 (55.2)	5.9 (42.6)	1.7 (35.1)	11.7 (53.1)
Daily mean °C (°F)	−2.7 (27.1)	−1.3 (29.7)	2.3 (36.1)	6.9 (44.4)	11.8 (53.2)	14.9 (58.8)	16.2 (61.2)	15.8 (60.4)	12.5 (54.5)	8.2 (46.8)	3.1 (37.6)	−0.8 (30.6)	7.2 (45.0)
Mean daily minimum °C (°F)	−5.7 (21.7)	−4.4 (24.1)	−1.3 (29.7)	2.1 (35.8)	6.3 (43.3)	9.4 (48.9)	10.6 (51.1)	10.4 (50.7)	7.9 (46.2)	4.5 (40.1)	0.5 (32.9)	−3.6 (25.5)	3.1 (37.5)
Record low °C (°F)	−29.7 (−21.5)	−27.5 (−17.5)	−26.9 (−16.4)	−8.2 (17.2)	−3.3 (26.1)	−0.2 (31.6)	2.6 (36.7)	1.1 (34.0)	−4.1 (24.6)	−7.6 (18.3)	−19.3 (−2.7)	−26.9 (−16.4)	−29.7 (−21.5)
Average precipitation mm (inches)	22 (0.9)	24 (0.9)	27 (1.1)	35 (1.4)	74 (2.9)	91 (3.6)	86 (3.4)	88 (3.5)	47 (1.9)	36 (1.4)	38 (1.5)	26 (1.0)	594 (23.5)
Average precipitation days (≥ 1.0 mm)	5.9	5.9	7.3	7.3	10.3	10.9	10.4	9.9	6.7	6.2	7.8	7.3	95.9
Source: NOAA

== Demographics ==
Historical population

Year	Pop.	±%
1620	6,500	—
1734	4,400	−32.3%
1807	4,549	+3.4%
1809	4,887	+7.4%
1816	5,510	+12.7%
1825	6,187	+12.3%
1834	6,644	+7.4%
1840	7,654	+15.2%
1843	7,777	+1.6%

Year	Pop.	±%
1849	8,222	+5.7%
1858	13,052	+58.7%
1871	11,545	−11.5%
1880	13,307	+15.3%
1890	13,501	+1.5%
1900	14,926	+10.6%
1910	17,121	+14.7%
1925	16,563	−3.3%
1939	22,000	+32.8%

Year	Pop.	±%
1950	17,171	−22.0%
1960	23,344	+36.0%
1978	28,592	+22.5%
1988	30,111	+5.3%
2002	29,173	−3.1%
2011	28,750	−1.4%
2021	25,717	−10.5%

== Tourist attractions ==
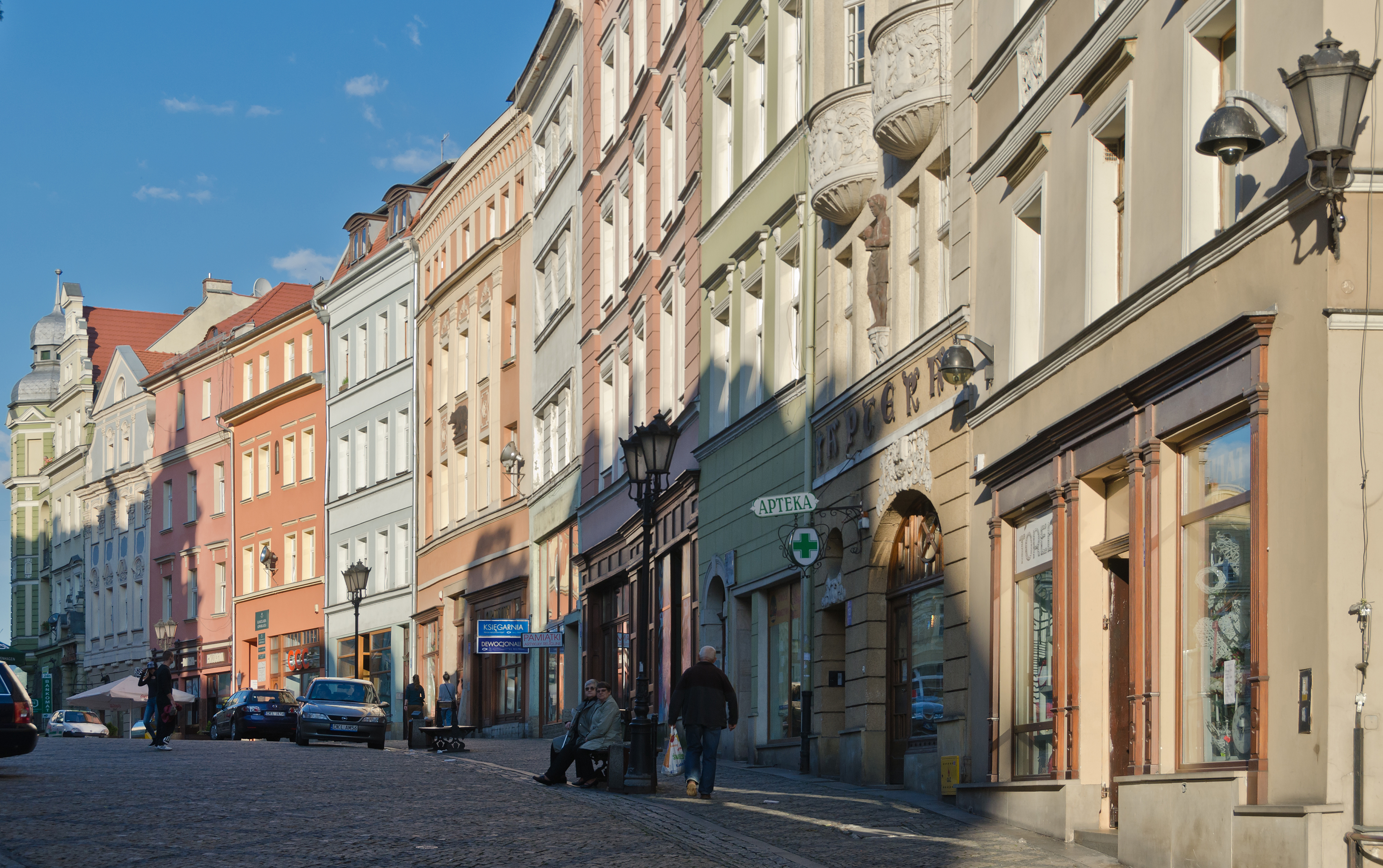
Colourful townhouses at the market square

- Gothic bridge – often called a "Charles Bridge in miniature" due to its resemblance to one of the most notable historical monuments of Prague. The bridge survived a flood in 1997. The legend is that the bridge is made from eggs components.
- City tunnels – parts of the tunnels constructed under the city since the 13th century are open for the public
- Collegiate Church of Assumption – one of the most notable examples of Gothic architecture in Poland, constructed by the Order of Saint John in the 14th century, one of the burial sites of the Piast dynasty
- Baroque Church of Our Lady of the Rosary and the Franciscan monastery
- The fortress – a unique stronghold on a high rock overlooking the city, first erected on this spot in the 9th century. During the reign of King Frederick the Great, it was one of the largest fortresses in Prussia. Serving as a Prussian and German prison for prisoners of various nationalities, including Polish insurgents and independence activists in the 19th century, and civilian forced laborers and Allied prisoners of war from World War II, it contains multiple memorials to former inmates.
- Town hall, built in 1890, but the older Gothic-Renaissance tower has been preserved
- Kłodzko Land Museum
- Marian Column – located at the market square, or the town square. It depicts the Blessed Virgin Mary and was constructed after a plague in 1625. This is a common sight in many other cities and towns that once belonged to the Habsburg monarchy.
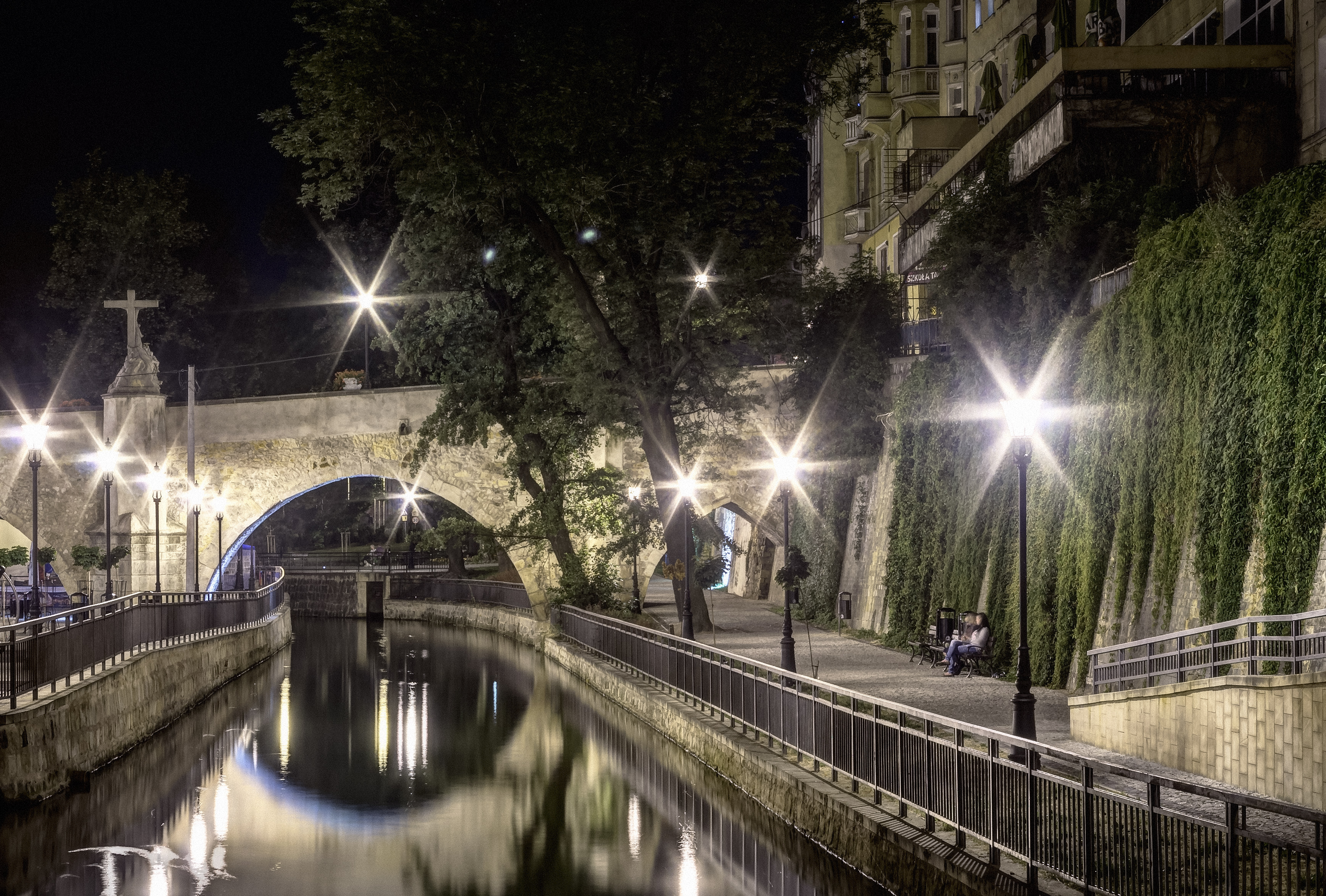
Night view of the Gothic bridge

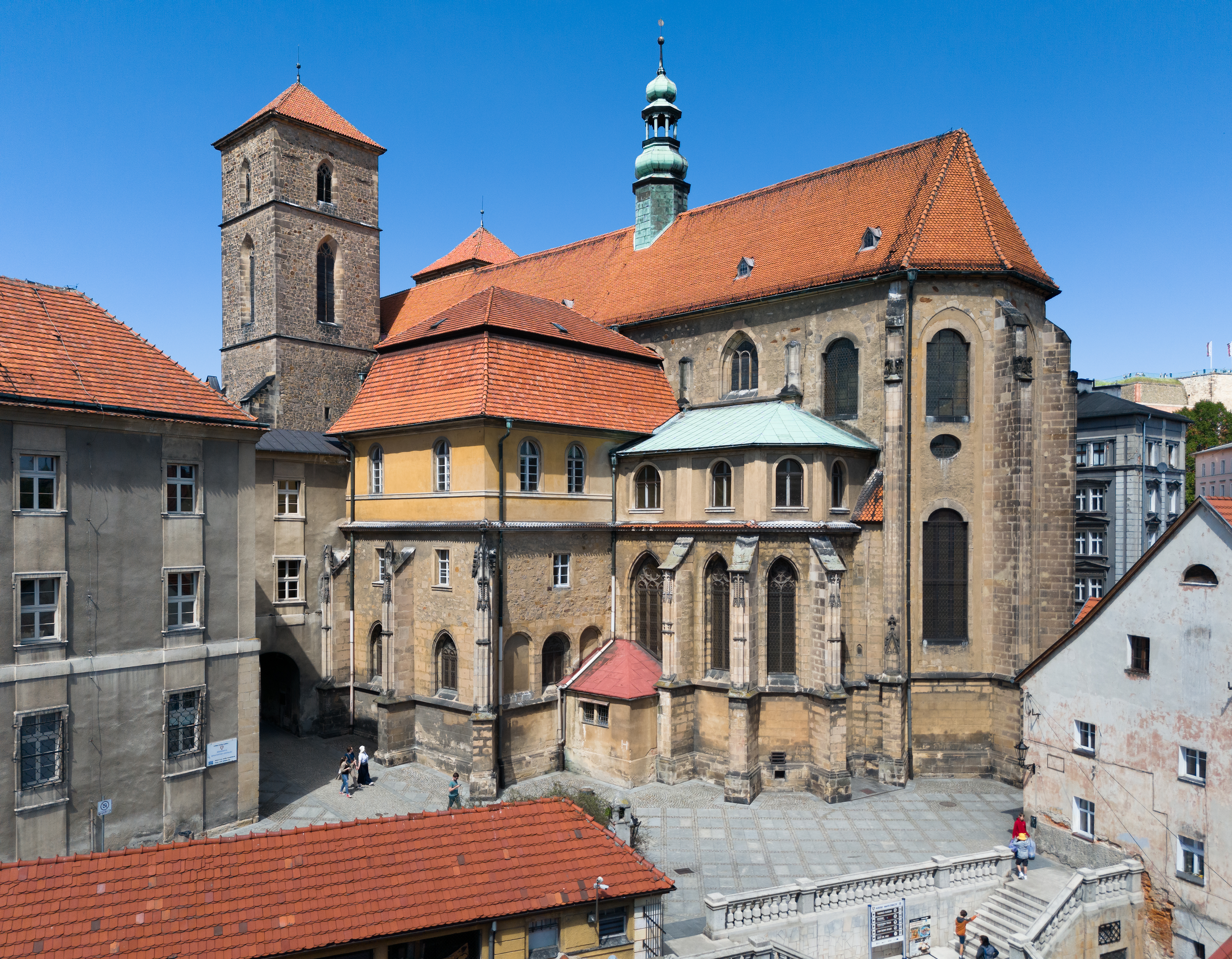
Church of the Assumption

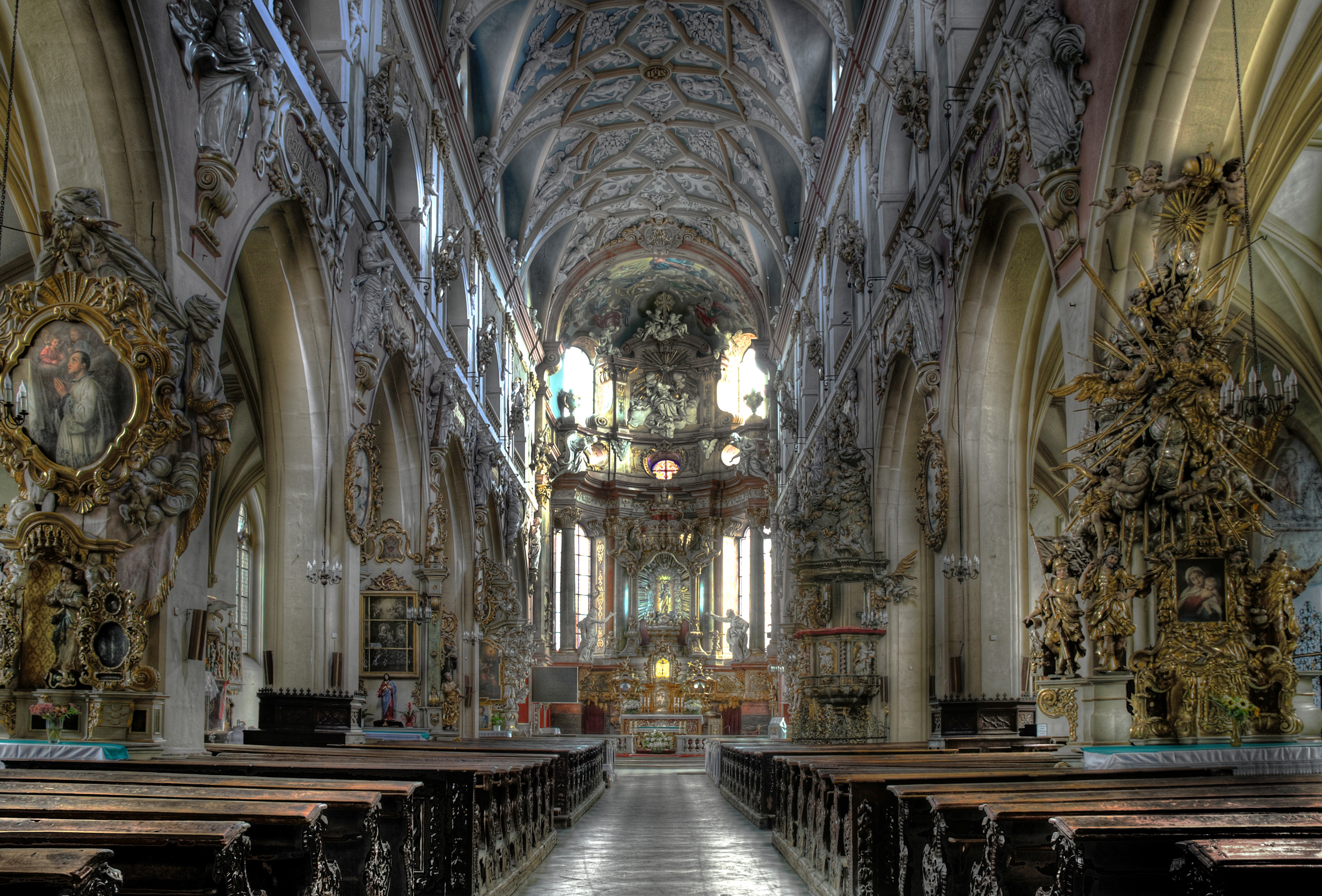
Interior of the Church of the Assumption

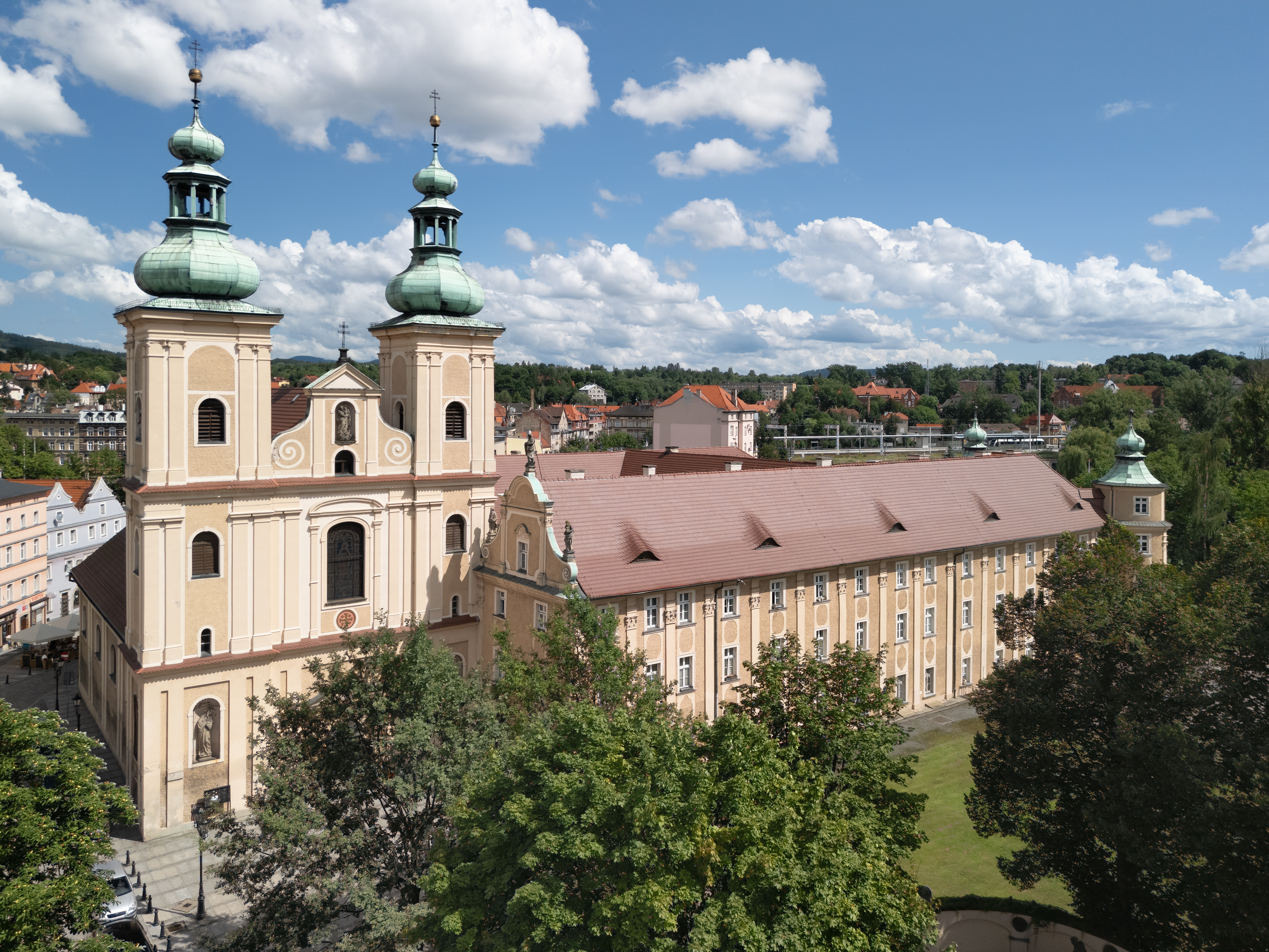
Our Lady of the Rosary church and Franciscan monastery

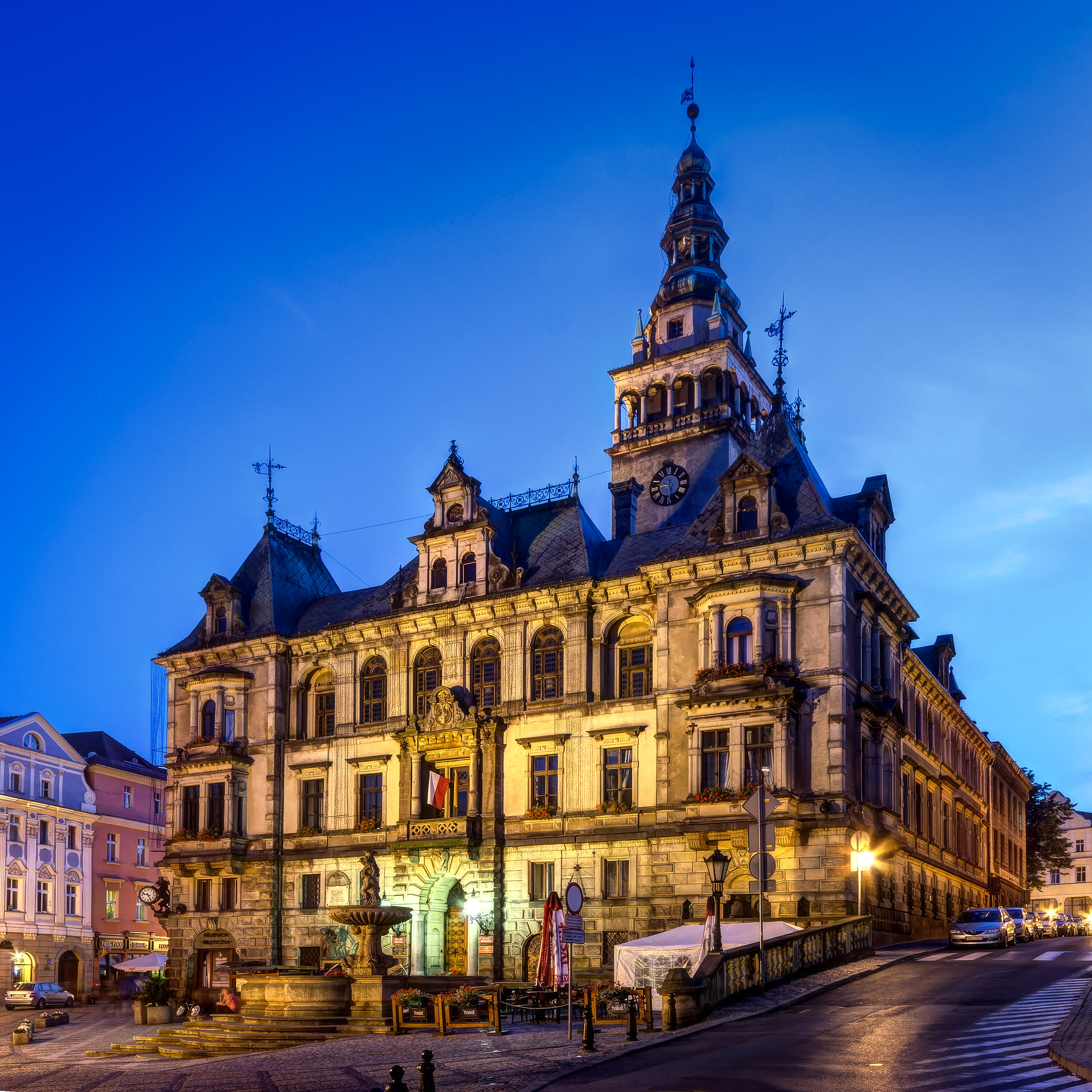
Night view of the town hall

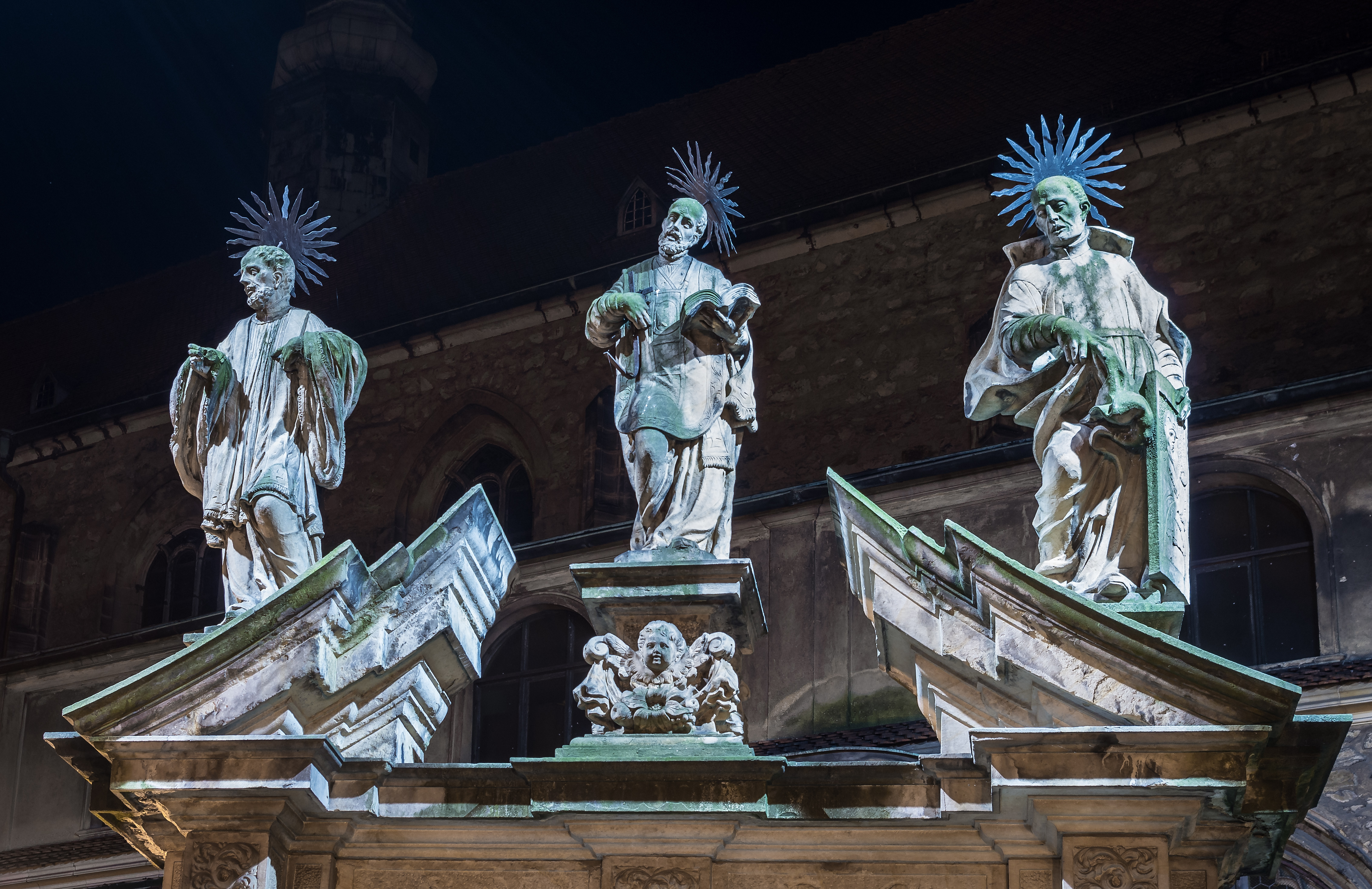
Baroque sculptures of Jesuit saints in the Old Town

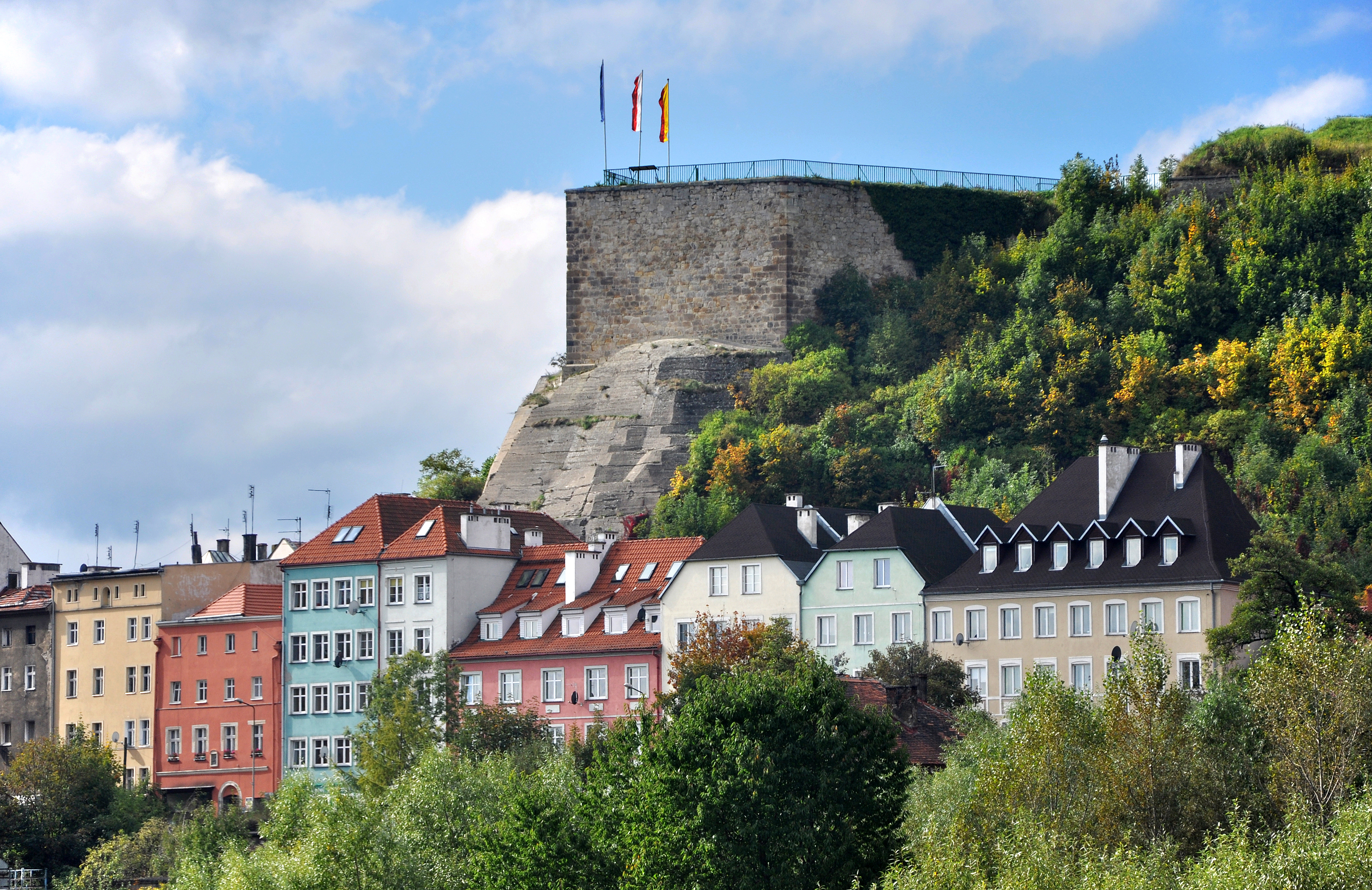
Kłodzko Fortress overlooking the town

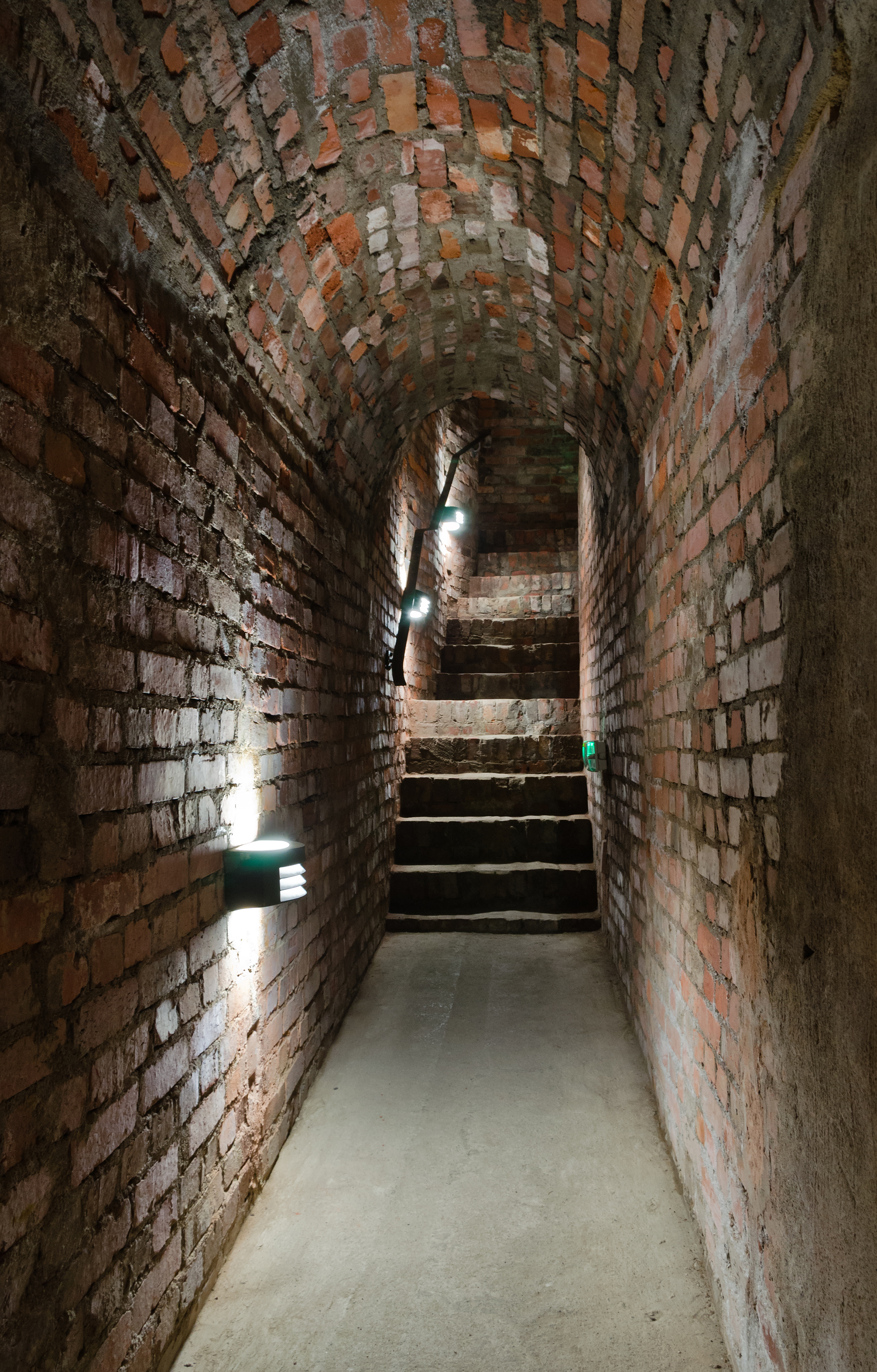
Underground tourist route

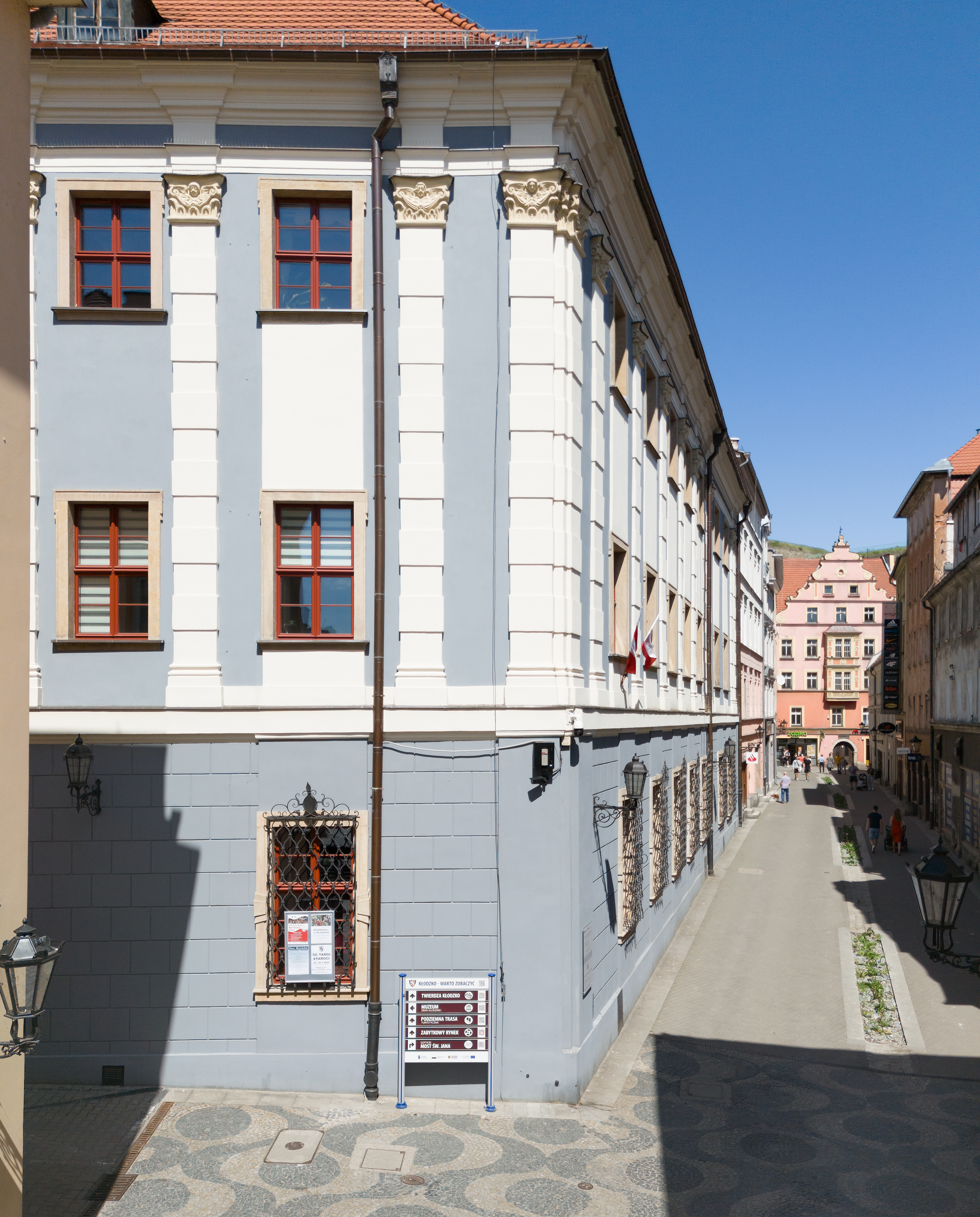
Kłodzko Land Museum

Kłodzko Culture Center

== Education ==
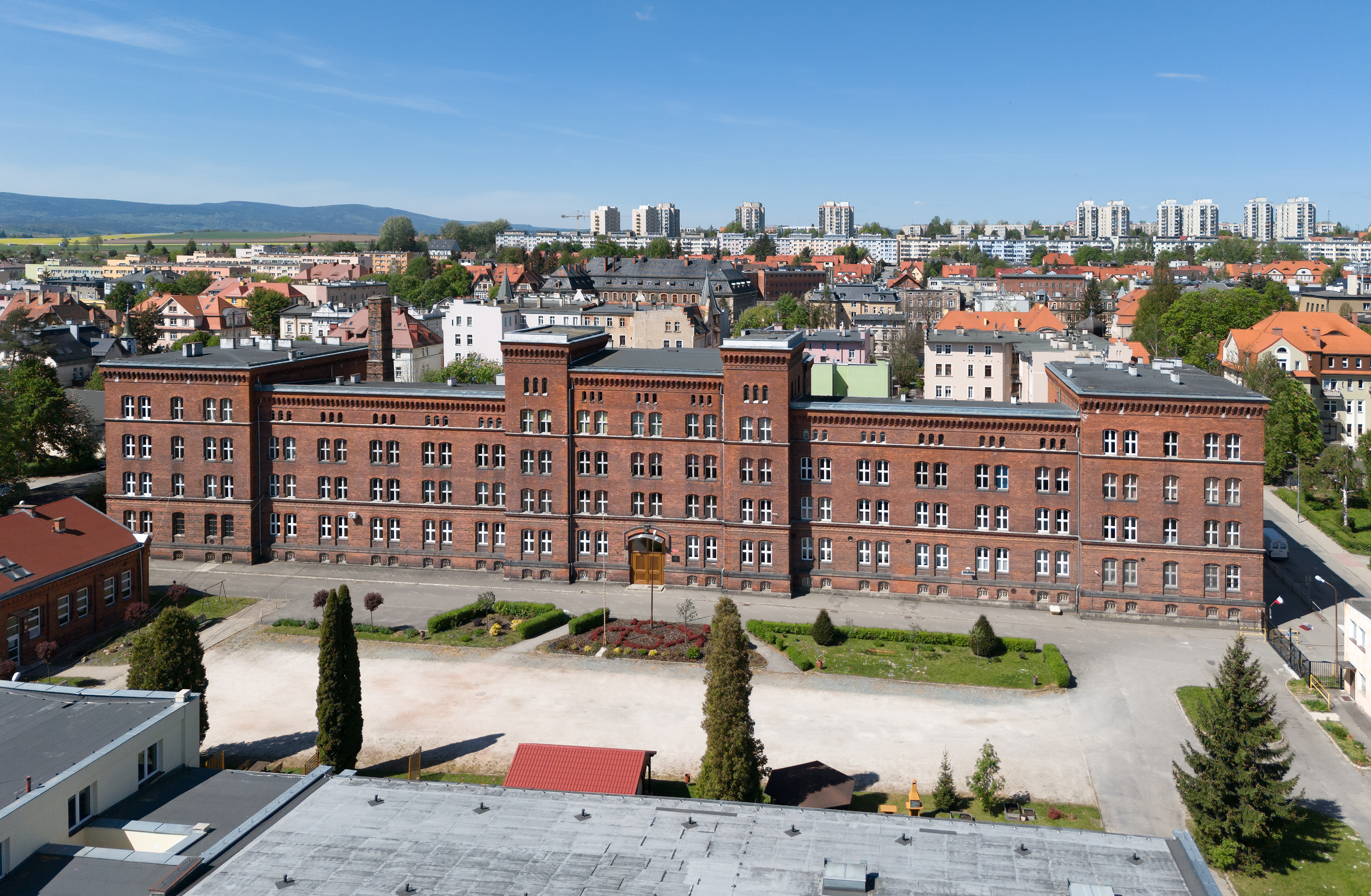
Kłodzko's School of Enterprise

Educational establishments in Kłodzko include:

- a branch of the Wrocław-based "Edukacja" College of Management
- the Bolesław Chrobry Lyceum (secondary school)
- Kłodzko's School of Enterprise (secondary school)
- technical school complex in Kłodzko (secondary school)

== Sports ==
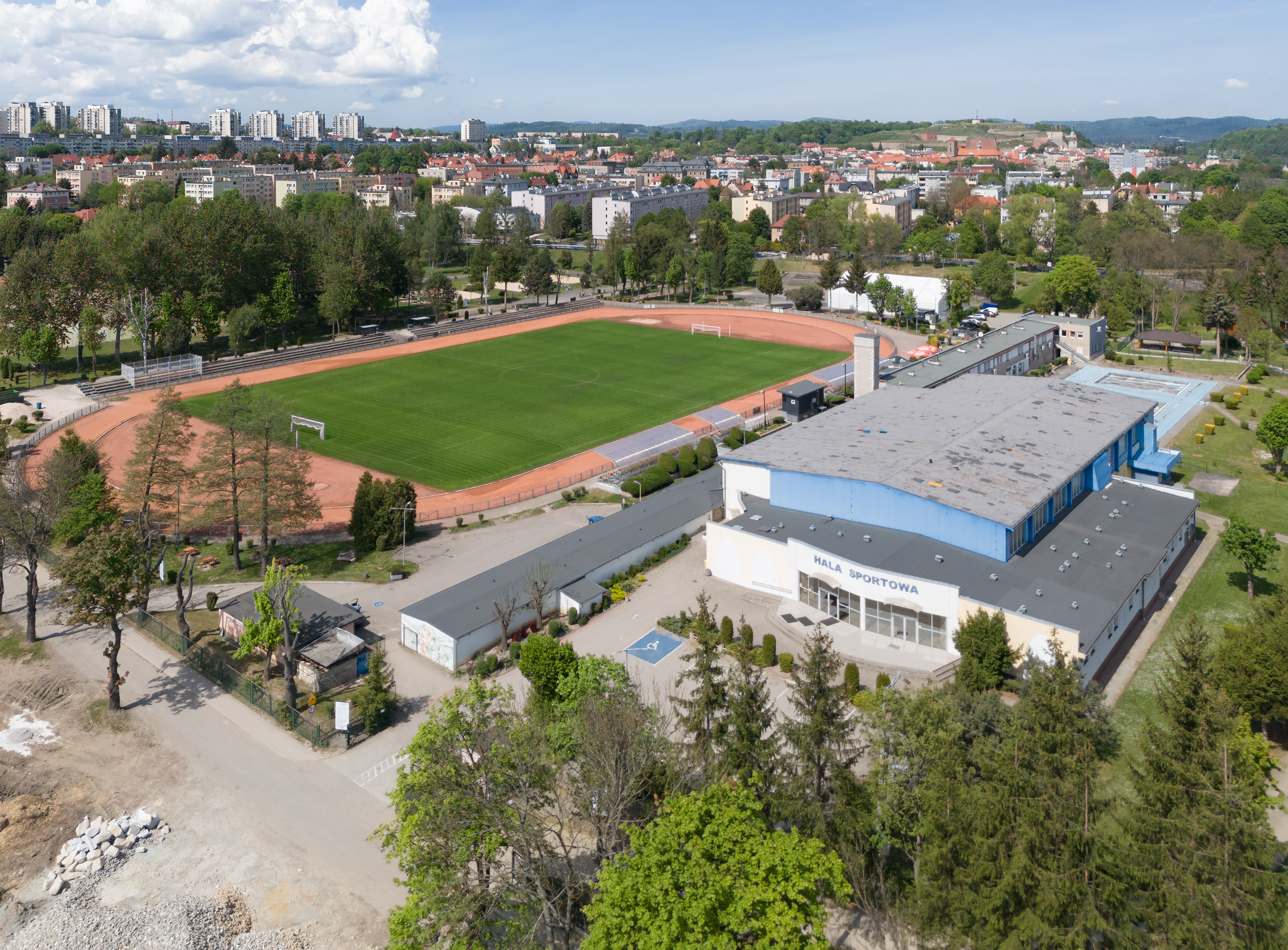
Football and athletics stadium and sports hall in Kłodzko, home venues of the Nysa Kłodzko football team and Doral Nysa Kłodzko basketball team

The two main sports teams of Kłodzko are football team Nysa Kłodzko and basketball team Doral Nysa Kłodzko.

== Notable residents ==
- Michael Friedrich von Althann (1680–1734), bishop and politician
- Gustav Adolf von Götzen (1866–1910), explorer
- Wilhelm Hemprich (1796–1825), scientist
- Emma Ihrer (1857–1911), politician
- Łukasz Krawczuk (born 1989), male sprinter
- Annelies Kupper (1906–1987), opera singer
- Friedrich Wilhelm von Lindeiner-Wildau (1880–1963), Luftwaffe officer
- Gabriela Muskała (born 1969), actress
- Weronika Nowakowska (born 1986), female biathlete
- David Origanus (1558–1628), mathematician
- Ernest of Pardubice (1297–1364), the first Archbishop of Prague
- Johann Christoph Pezel (1639–1694), composer
- Mirosław Pękala (born 1961), former Polish international footballer
- Zdzisław J. Porosiński (1955–2016), mathematician
- Oswald Rathmann (1891–?), cyclist
- Otto Reche (1879–1966), scientist
- Friedrich Wilhelm Riemer (1774–1845), secretary of Johann Wolfgang von Goethe
- Friedrich Wilhelm Sander (1885–1938), engineer
- Albrecht Schubert (1886–1966), Wehrmacht general
- Renée Sintenis (1888–1965), artist
- Maciej Soboń (born 1979), retired footballer
- Eduard Tauwitz (1812–1894), composer
- Sophie Charlotte Elisabeth Ursinus (1760–1836), serial killer
- Bogdan Zdrojewski (born 1957), politician

== Surroundings ==
- Stołowe Mountains (Table Mountains) with Stołowe Mountains National Park
- Spa resorts in Polanica-Zdrój, Duszniki-Zdrój, Kudowa-Zdrój & Lądek-Zdrój
- Medieval town of Niemcza
- Cistercian monastery at Henryków
- Wojsławice Arboretum
- Gola Dzierżoniowska Castle

== Twin towns – sister cities ==
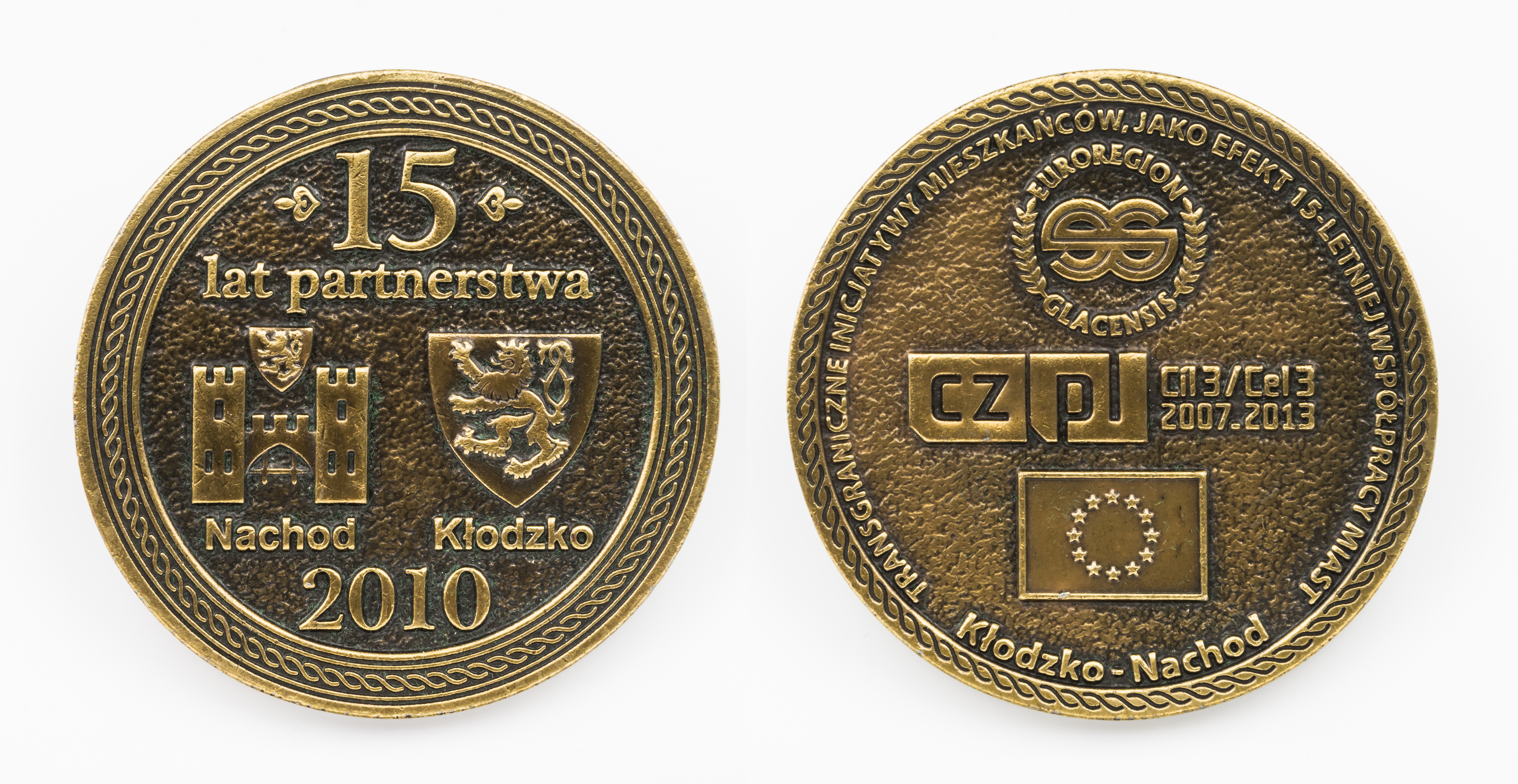
Medal from 2010 commemorating the 15th anniversary of the town twinning of Kłodzko and Náchod

Kłodzko is twinned with:

- Bensheim, Germany
- Carvin, France
- Fléron, Belgium
- Limanowa, Poland
- Náchod, Czech Republic
- Rădăuți, Romania
- Rychnov nad Kněžnou, Czech Republic

== See also ==
- Kłodzko Land
- County of Kladsko (historical)
