= Church of the Assumption, Kłodzko =

- Kolegiata Wniebowzięcia Najświętszej Maryi Panny w Kłodzku
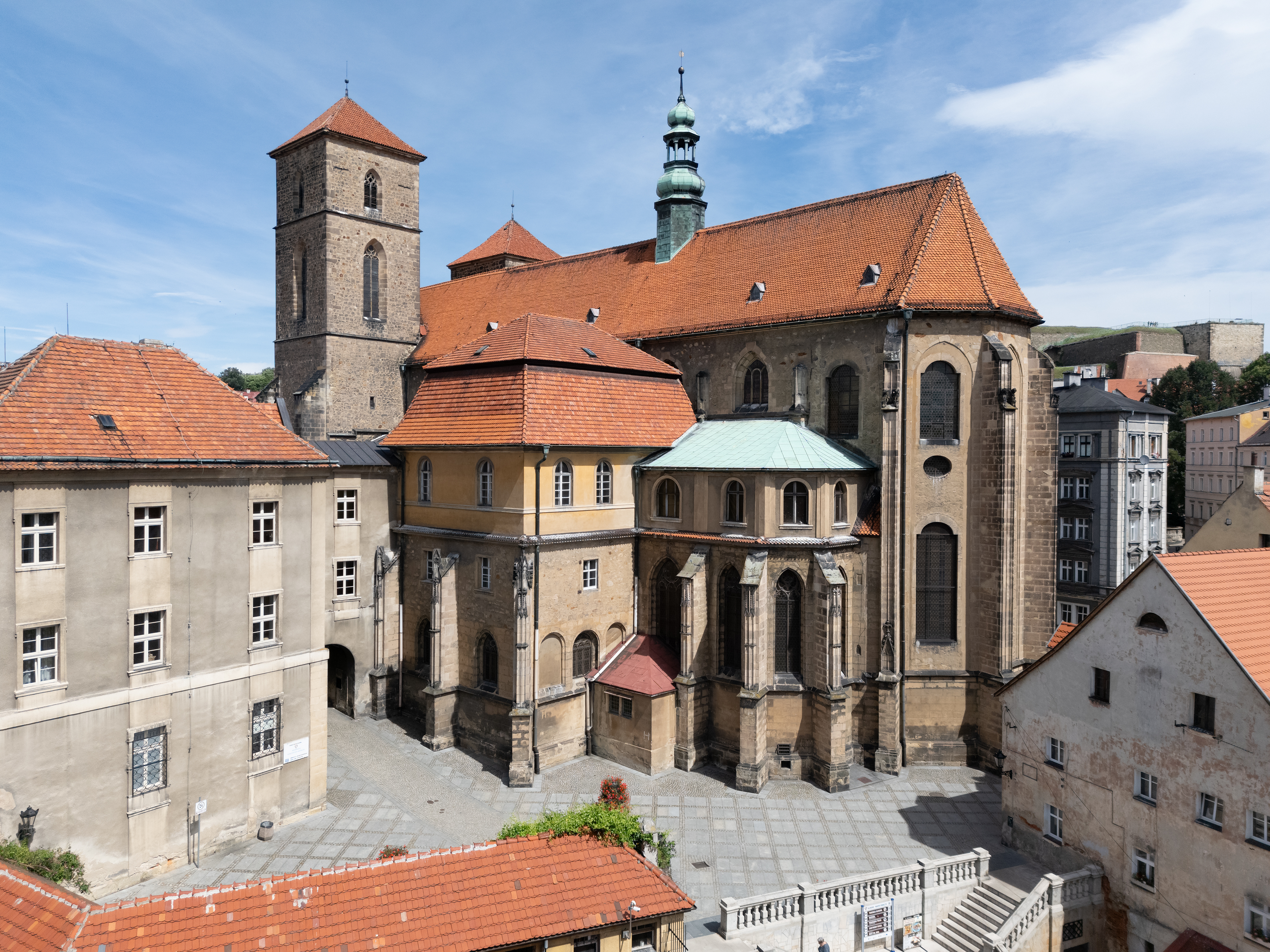

- 50°26′16″N 16°39′10″E
- Location: Kłodzko
- Country: Poland
- Language: Polish
- Denomination: Catholic

History
- Status: Collegiate church
- Founded: 14th century
- Dedication: Assumption of Mary

Architecture
- Functional status: Active
- Heritage designation: Cultural heritage site
- Designated: 29 March 1949
- Style: Gothic

Administration
- Diocese: Świdnica
- Deanery: Kłodzko
- Parish: Assumption of Mary Parish in Kłodzko

The Collegiate Church of the Assumption of the Blessed Virgin Mary (Polish: Kolegiata Wniebowzięcia Najświętszej Maryi Panny w Kłodzku) is a Gothic collegiate church in Kłodzko, Poland, one of the landmarks of its Old Town.

It was constructed from the fourteenth through the sixteenth centuries, and houses the remains of Arnošt of Pardubice, the first Archbishop of Prague. The church possesses rich historical decorations and furnishings, including a Gothic vault, portal, baptismal font, Gothic and Renaissance sculptures and Baroque altars, confessionals and organs. The high altar was designed and built by the Tyrolean architect Christoph Tausch in the years 1728–1729. In 1948–1949, it was the first parish Karol Wojtyła, the future Pope John Paul II, was assigned his first pastoral assignment after completing his graduate studies in Rome and returning to Poland.

== Gallery ==
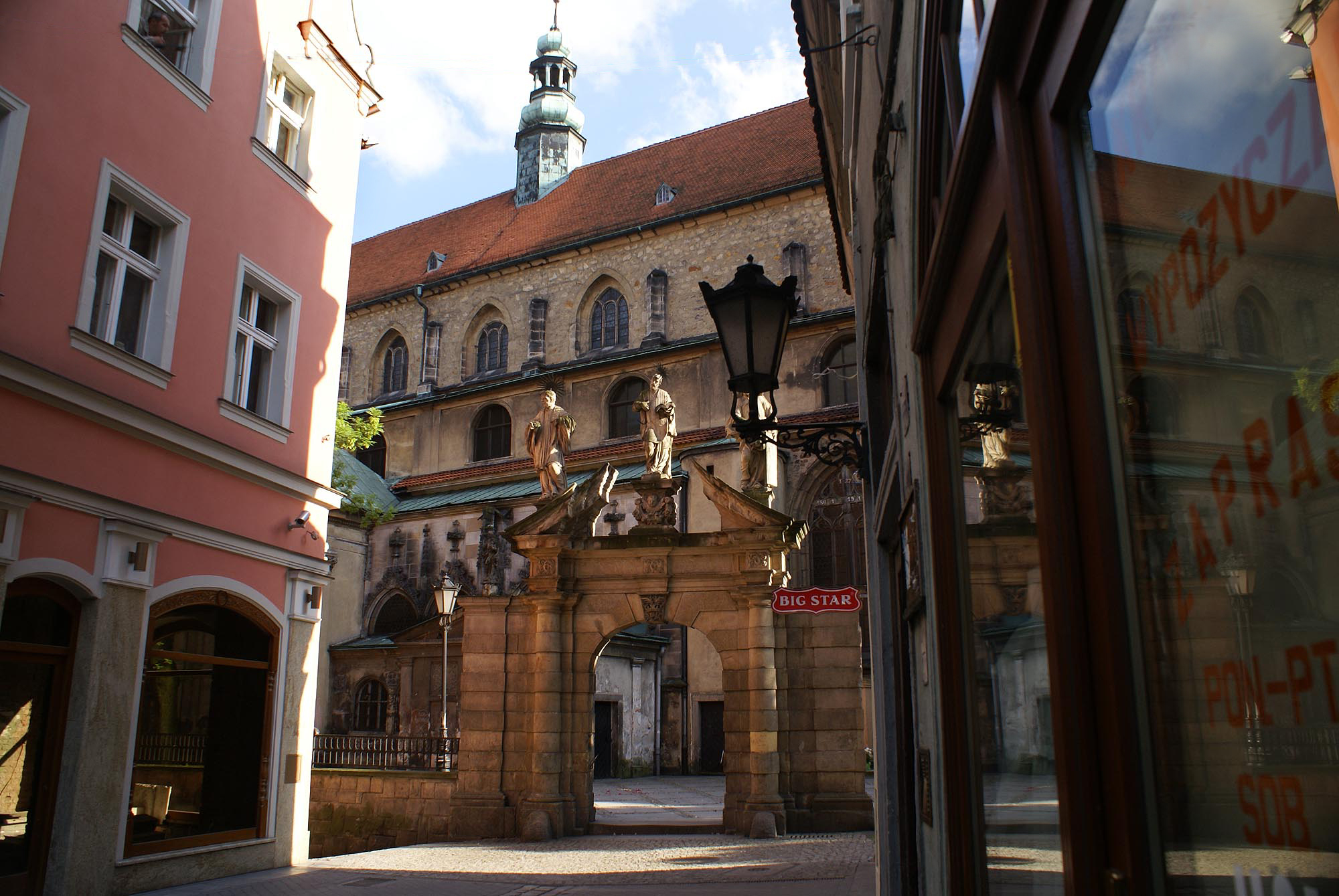
Church and Baroque gate seen from an Old Town street

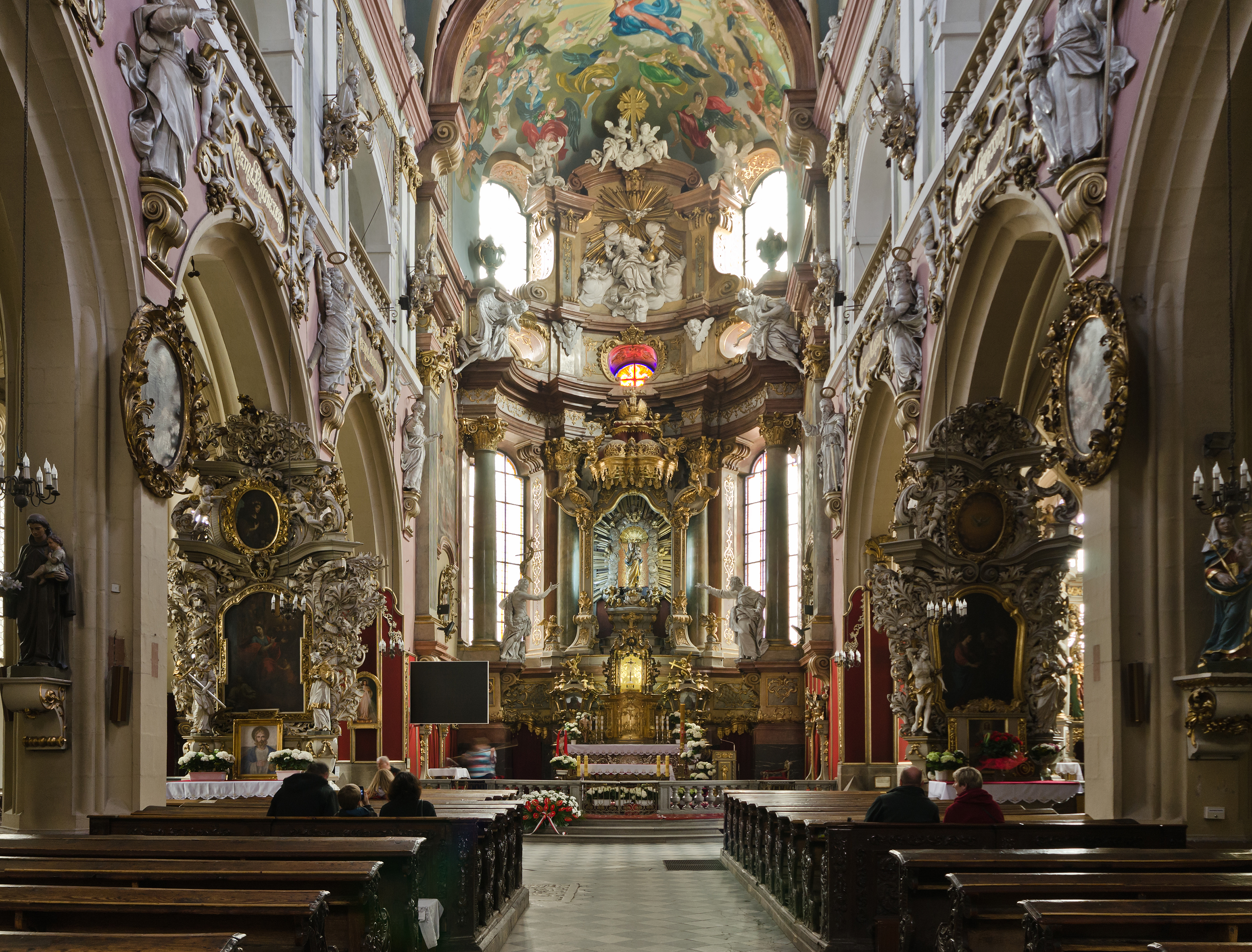
Interior

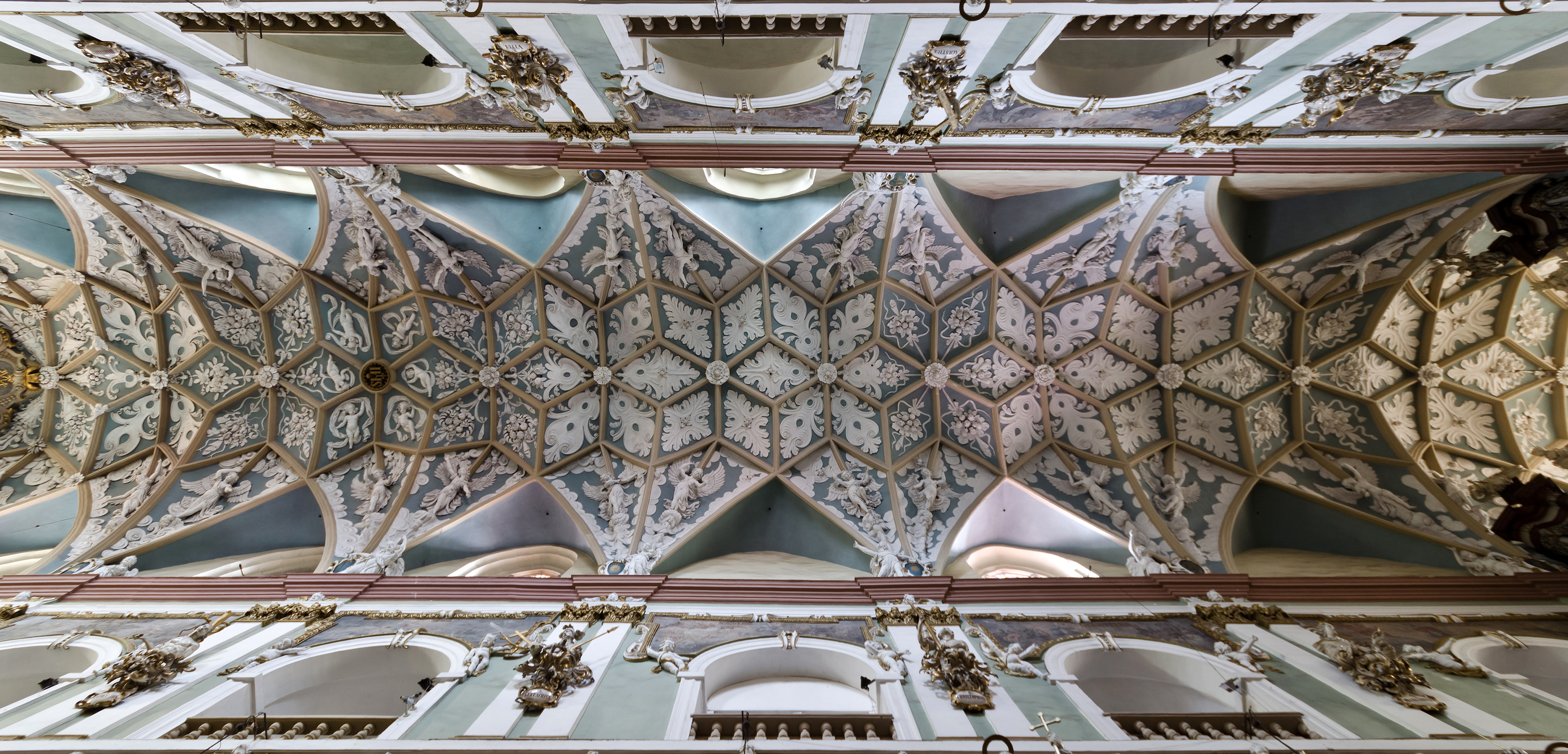
Gothic vault

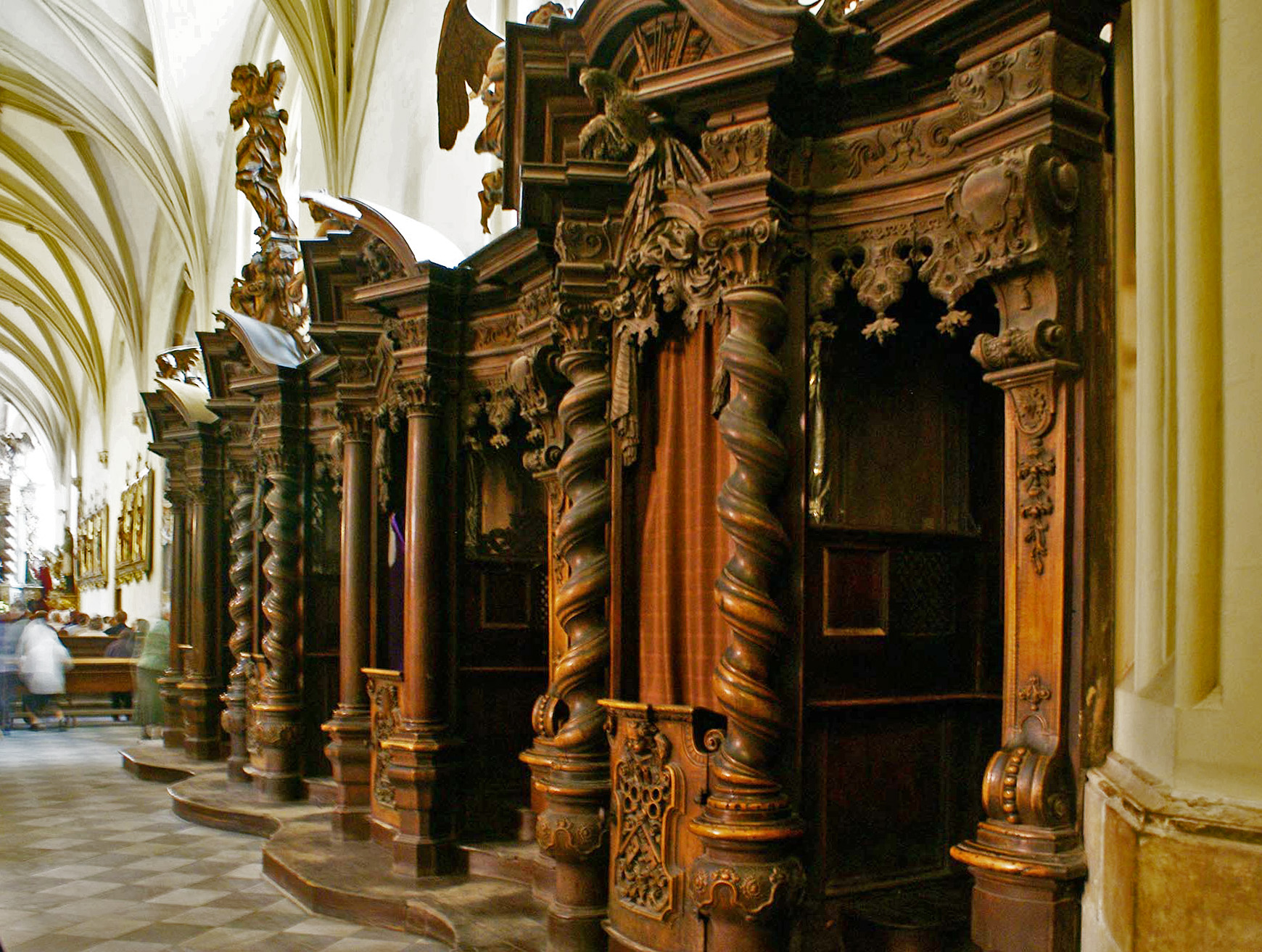
Baroque confessionals
