= Society of the Enthusiasts of the Kłodzko Land =

Regional cultural association in Kłodzko, Poland

- Towarzystwo Miłośników Ziemi Kłodzkiej (Polish)
- Formation: September 11, 1947; 79 years ago
- Type: Voluntary association
- Headquarters: Kłodzko
- Region served: Kłodzko County
- Members: 85
- President: Adam Łącki
- Affiliations: Kłodzko Literary Club
- Website: mateusiak-server.pl/tmzk/index.php/pl

The Society of the Enthusiasts of the Kłodzko Land (Polish: Towarzystwo Miłośników Ziemi Kłodzkiej) is a community organization of enthusiasts and promoters of the Kłodzko Land, dedicated to cultural and social initiatives. It is the oldest Polish regional association established in Lower Silesia after 1945 and one of the oldest in Poland, with a legacy of achievements.

The statutory goal of the society is to "disseminate knowledge about the Kłodzko Land and initiate and promote research related to the region".

== History ==
In 1947, shortly after World War II, Polish settlers and repatriates, primarily from Kresy but also other regions of Poland, began building ties with their new homeland. The society was founded on 11 September 1947 in the meeting room of the Kłodzko County Office, led by Kłodzko County starosta Zbigniew Kulczycki and Helena Getterowa. It became a branch of the Silesian Institute in Katowice. Kulczycki, a historian of tourism and regionalist, also had a part in organizing the region's administration.

A subsequent meeting on 4 October 1947, held in the council chamber of Kłodzko City Hall, attended by Silesian Institute director Roman Lutman and Polish Academy of Sciences Spatial Planning Committee member Antoni Wrzosek, outlined the society's objectives, including coordinating scientific and research activities. This period involved promoting the historical continuity of the region, creating a narrative of returning to the "Motherland" after centuries, and intensifying socio-cultural activities to emotionally connect residents with the Recovered Territories.

In June 1948, the Silesian Institute was incorporated into the Western Institute in Poznań and relocated to Wrocław. By 1950, the Wrocław branch was dissolved, ending the Silesian Institute's existence. Until 1950, when centralist policies halted its activities, the society had established itself in Kłodzko as an organization of history enthusiasts and local patriots, tasked with "promoting the region, its tourist, economic, and historical assets". The society coordinated research, organized cultural life in community centers, and engaged in publishing. Kłodzko aimed to become a cultural and scientific hub of supra-provincial significance. The society was reactivated in 1957.

== Past activities ==
In 1948, the society organized two exhibitions: the First Kłodzko Regional Exhibition, opened on 31 July, showcasing the post-war economic and cultural achievements of the region (people and land, industry, cooperatives, crafts, Kłodzko Land spas, and a Polish-Czech corner), and an exhibition on the "Historical Past and Economic and Cultural Achievements after 1945".

The Kłodzko Poetic Springs, held in the 1960s and 1970s, gained national recognition as a cultural event, featuring poets like Anna Zelenay, Jan Kulka, and Bogusław Michnik. During this period, the society produced "poetic broadsheets", a form of poetic-pictorial posters displaying award-winning poems and works by Kłodzko artists.

The society initiated and organized or co-organized regional cultural and social events, such as the Kłodzko Cultural Sejmiks and Kłodzko Literary Tuesdays.

The society played a role in establishing the Kłodzko Land Museum and the Bystrzyca Kłodzka Phillumeny Museum. From the early 1960s, society members, alongside filmmaker Robert Stando (creator of the 1955 film Miasto, które może zginąć) and professor Zbigniew Strzelecki, contributed to efforts to revitalize Kłodzko's old town, threatened by water infiltration into underground workings ("Alarm for Kłodzko"). This effort preserved the city's 1,000-year-old urban layout, with its multinational history and architecture.

The Society of the Enthusiasts of the Kłodzko Land is the oldest Polish regional society established in Lower Silesia after 1945 and one of the oldest in Poland. Over its 75-year history, the society has undertaken numerous initiatives, including historical research, promoting tourism and cultural heritage, scientific symposia, exhibitions, and competitions. It also contributed to establishing the tradition of Kłodzko Days in 1962. Many of its cultural, historical, educational, and social initiatives continue today. Under the leadership of Eugeniusz Kaczmarek, president from 1963 to 2008, the society established branches beyond the Kłodzko Land.

=== Publications until 2004 ===
In 1948, the society launched Rocznik Kłodzki, a repository of regional knowledge from scholarly research. Two volumes were published under this title: No. 1 for 1948 in 1949 and No. 2 for 1949 in 1950. From the third volume in 1958, it was renamed Rocznik Ziemi Kłodzkiej and continues to be published (after a hiatus from 2002 to 2018).

Other notable publications include:

- Walczak, Wojciech (1948). Kotlina Kłodzka i góry przyległe. Mapa fizyczna z uwzględnieniem komunikacji i szlaków turystycznych, skala 1:100 000. Mapy poboczne: Budowa geologiczna, Bogactwa mineralne, przemysł [Kłodzko Valley and Adjacent Mountains. Physical Map Including Transport and Tourist Trails, Scale 1:100,000. Side Maps: Geological Structure, Mineral Resources, Industry] (in Polish). Kłodzko; Polanica-Zdrój: Society of the Enthusiasts of the Kłodzko Land. OCLC 956582851.
- Illustrated guide: Wrzosek, Antoni; Kulczycki, Zbigniew; Stroynowski, Henryk (1948). Ziemia Kłodzka [Kłodzko Land] (in Polish). Kłodzko: Polish Tatra Society. OCLC 297628890.
- Kaczmarek, Eugeniusz; Michnik, Bogusław; Turkiewicz, Witold (1966). Kłodzkie Wiosny Poetyckie [Kłodzko Poetic Springs] (in Polish). Kłodzko: Society of the Enthusiasts of the Kłodzko Land. OCLC 838920095.
- Poetry collection: Turkiewicz, Witold (1968). Mowy Leśmianowskie, wygłoszone przez Juliana Przybosia, Mariana Jachimowicza i Zbigniewa Bieńkowskiego na VI Kłodzkiej Wiośnie Poetyckiej poświęconej pamięci Bolesława Leśmiana [Leśmian Speeches, Delivered by Julian Przyboś, Marian Jachimowicz, and Zbigniew Bieńkowski at the 6th Kłodzko Poetic Spring Dedicated to the Memory of Bolesław Leśmian] (in Polish). Kłodzko: Society of the Enthusiasts of the Kłodzko Land. OCLC 84311384.
- Turkiewicz, Witold, ed. (1970). Kłodzki Almanach Literacki [Kłodzko Literary Almanac] (in Polish). Kłodzko: Kłodzko Literary Club. OCLC 839048816.
- Michnik, Bogusław (1972). Motyw kłodzki. Wiersze o Kłodzku i ziemi kłodzkiej [The Kłodzko Motif: Poems About Kłodzko and the Kłodzko Land] (in Polish). Wrocław: Zakł. Narod. im. Ossolińskich. OCLC 174445587.
- Ziemia Kłodzka: rozwój, tradycje, problemy [Kłodzko Land: Development, Traditions, Problems] (in Polish). Kłodzko: Society of the Enthusiasts of the Kłodzko Land. 1977. OCLC 749622445.
- Kaczmarek, E.; Kraj, Mariusz, eds. (1978). Towarzystwo Miłośników Ziemi Kłodzkiej [Society of the Enthusiasts of the Kłodzko Land] (in Polish). Kłodzko: Society of the Enthusiasts of the Kłodzko Land. OCLC 749802639.
- Kaczmarek, E.; Kraj, M.; Goryń, Anna, eds. (1979). Kłodzko wczoraj, dziś, jutro [Kłodzko: Yesterday, Today, Tomorrow] (in Polish). Kłodzko: Society of the Enthusiasts of the Kłodzko Land. OCLC 749802639.
- Gamalczyk, Dionizy (1986). Kłodzko w czterdziestoleciu Polskiej Rzeczypospolitej Ludowej [Kłodzko During the Forty Years of the Polish People's Republic] (in Polish). Kłodzko: Society of the Enthusiasts of the Kłodzko Land. OCLC 835854991.
- Kaczmarek, E., ed. (1995). Pierwsze dni, pierwsze lata [The First Days, the First Years] (in Polish). Kłodzko: Society of the Enthusiasts of the Kłodzko Land. OCLC 835086916.
- Kaczmarek, E., ed. (2004). Ziemia Kłodzka w grafice Wł. Kolbusza [Kłodzko Land in the Graphics of Wł. Kolbusz] (in Polish). Kłodzko: Society of the Enthusiasts of the Kłodzko Land. ISBN 978-83-919200-1-5.

== Contemporary activities ==
Recent initiatives include:

- Resumption of Rocznik Ziemi Kłodzkiej in 2018 after a 14-year hiatus, with subsequent issues in 2021 and 2025.
- Discovery in 2016 of a 16th-century manuscript, Kaufbuch (a merchant's ledger) from Radków, which was studied by museum curator Krystyna Oniszczuk-Awiżeń and donated to the Kłodzko Land Museum.
- Organizing events, exhibitions, and scientific conferences on tourism, promotion, and the region's economy.

Projects such as "Artists at Work for the Kłodzko Land" (2018), theatrical-cabaret performances like "Women's Day" (since 2016), and poetry events titled "Power of the Word" (since 2017) have attracted supporters and large audiences. In 2020, during an educational excursion to Klepáč, led by guide Leszek Majewski, the society designated the true source of the Eastern Neisse, naming it "Szczodre".

The society promotes the Kłodzko Land through methods such as:

- A happening, Topienie Koronawirusa (Coronavirus drowning), instead of the traditional Marzanna drowning (21 March 2021), featured on TVN24 and Szkło kontaktowe.
- Promotion of a "I Love Kłodzko Land" car sticker (2022), used by over 1,000 drivers.
- A poem, O miłości do Ziemi Kłodzkiej, by Jerzy Taurogiński.
- A song, Pieśń o Ziemi Kłodzkiej (an unofficial anthem), Ziemia Kłodzka naszą bajką jest, with lyrics by Bartłomiej Kolman set to the melody of The Beatles' Yellow Submarine, arranged by Ewa Leśniczak (2021). It premiered during the Dîner en Blanc at the square by the Młynówka Gothic Bridge in Kłodzko.

The society participates in events organized by the Kłodzko Cultural Center and other local associations. It plans to expand regional promotion through an interactive mobile miniature of the Kłodzko Land with holograms of major tourist attractions, highlighting the region's concentration of over 500 attractions, including five Polish spas, within a 50 km radius of the over 1,000-year-old city of Kłodzko. In October 2022, the society celebrated its 75th anniversary with an exhibition, a film, an album, and the unveiling of a commemorative plaque at the Kłodzko Cultural Center.

== Presidents and notable members ==
The first chairman was Zbigniew Kulczycki (1947–1948), followed by Wincenty Gonciarczyk (1957–1959), Jan Małek (1959–1963), Eugeniusz Kaczmarek (1963–2008, president from 1979), and Jadwiga Radziejewska (president 2009–2016, director of the Kłodzko Healthcare Centre). Since 30 May 2016, Adam Łącki, Kłodzko County starosta from 2002 to 2006, has been president.

The founding board included Zbigniew Kulczycki, Roman Birkenmayer (vice-chairman, director of the gymnasium and Bolesław Chrobry High School), Helena Getterowa (long-term secretary and founder of the Phillumeny Museum), and Bohdan Biliński (treasurer and chronicler). The next board included Mikołaj Dawidiuk (Kulczycki's successor as starosta), Albin Bobruk (writer and editor of Dziennik Ludowy), and Aleksander Młynkiewicz (Polish Socialist Party activist, head of the State Repatriation Office, and Kłodzko mayor from 1947 to 1950).

Notable members include Władysław Dziewulski (former Bystrzyca Kłodzka deputy starosta, later at the Silesian Institute in Opole), Roman Sakaluk, Janina Piechocińska, Stanisław Bielawski, Idalia Jakowczuk, Janina Bilewicz, Leszek Rektorek (filmmaker and Kłodzko documentarian), Elżbieta Junak (long-term secretary), Irena Klimaszewska (regionalist and Kłodzko Land Museum curator), Sudeten guides Romana Chimowicz-Majewska and Leszek Majewski, Maria Ozierańska (director of the Kudowa-Zdrój Toy Museum), vice-president Ignacy Einhorn, Lech Włodarczyk, Leszek Michalski (president of the 47th Prussian Infantry Regiment Historical Reenactment Group), and Bronisław Kamiński from Kudowa-Zdrój.

== Awards and eecognitions ==
The society has received numerous awards:

- Millennium of the Polish State Badge (1966)
- Golden Badge "Zasłużony dla Dolnego Śląska" (1972)
- Second place in the national competition by the Minister of Culture and Art for the best regional association (1989)
- Aleksander Patkowski Medal for promoting regionalism (2017)
- "zDolne NGO" title for the most active NGO in Lower Silesia (2018)

== Bibliography ==
- Zawadzka, Małgorzata (2022a). Metryka. Powrót dla przyszłości [Profile: Return for the Future] (in Polish).
- Zawadzka, Małgorzata (2022b). 75 lat Towarzystwa Miłośników Ziemi Kłodzkiej 1947–2022. Powrót dla przyszłości [75 Years of the Society of the Enthusiasts of the Kłodzko Land, 1947–2022: Return for the Future] (in Polish). ISBN 978-83-66996-13-7. Archived from the original on 3 November 2022.
