= Wambierzyce =

- Village
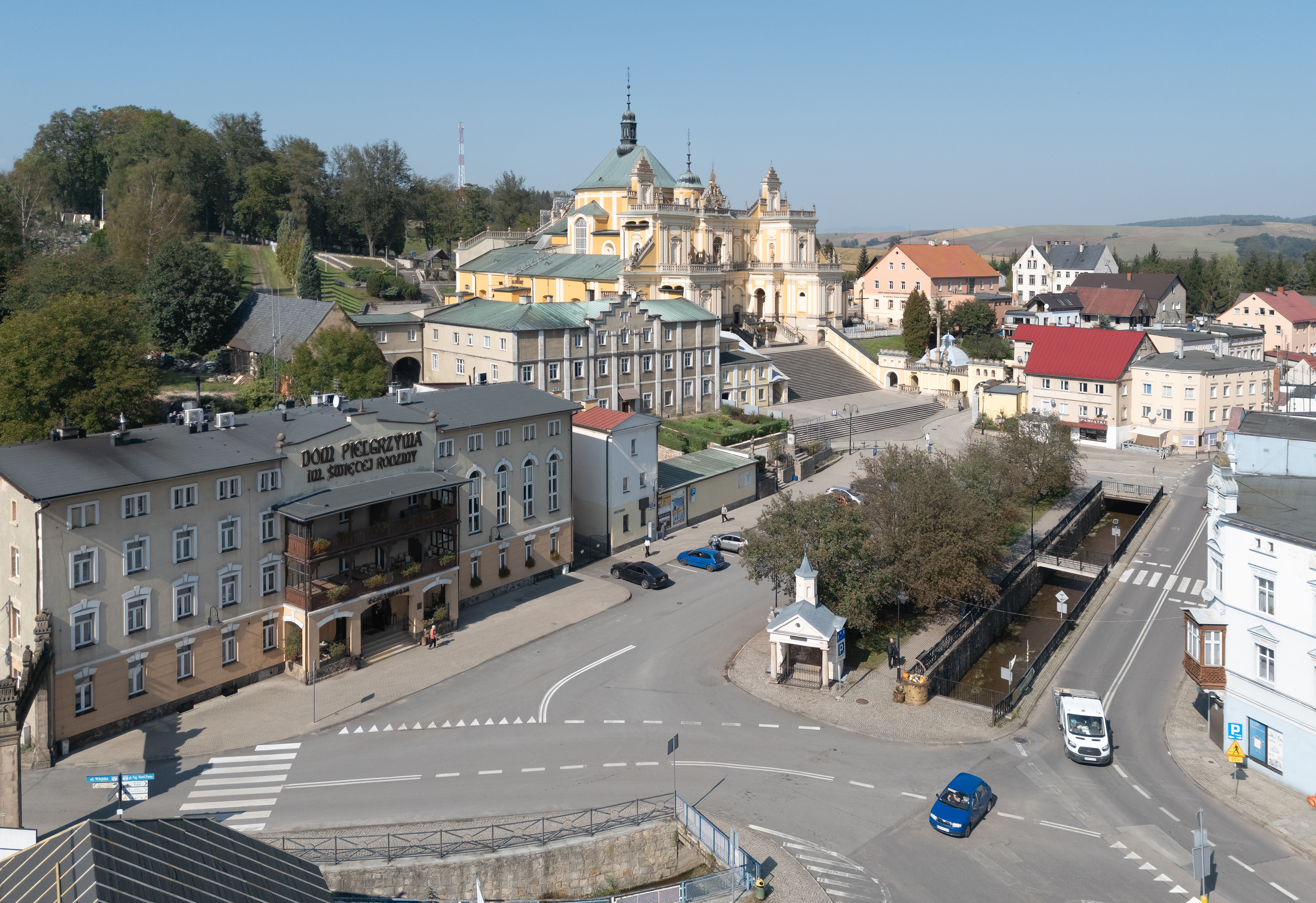
- General view of Wambierzyce with the Basilica of the Visitation

- Location within Poland
- Coordinates: 50°29′N 16°26′E
- Country: Poland
- Voivodeship: Lower Silesian
- County: Kłodzko
- Gmina: Radków
- Elevation (max.): 410 m (1,350 ft)
- Time zone: UTC+1 (CET)
  - Summer (DST): UTC+2 (CEST)
- Vehicle registration: DKL

Wambierzyce [vambʲɛˈʐɨt͡sɛ] is a village and popular Catholic pilgrimage site in south-western Poland, in Gmina Radków, Kłodzko County, Lower Silesian Voivodeship. It is situated at an altitude of 370–410 m in the picturesque Cedron valley on the eastern slopes of the Table Mountains.

== History ==
It is located in Kłodzko Land, a territory which in the Middle Ages often changed owners between Polish and Bohemian rulers. The place was first mentioned in 1330 as Alberndorf, then in 1398 as Alberdorf, in 1418 as Alberti villa, in 1560 as Alberichsdorf, which then evolved into the German name Albendorf. Czech pilgrims from Bohemia and Moravia called the place Vambeřice. In the 18th century, it was annexed by Prussia, and from 1871 it was also part of Germany. After Germany's defeat in World War II, in 1945, it became part of Poland under the Polish name Wambierzyce.

== Pilgrimage ==
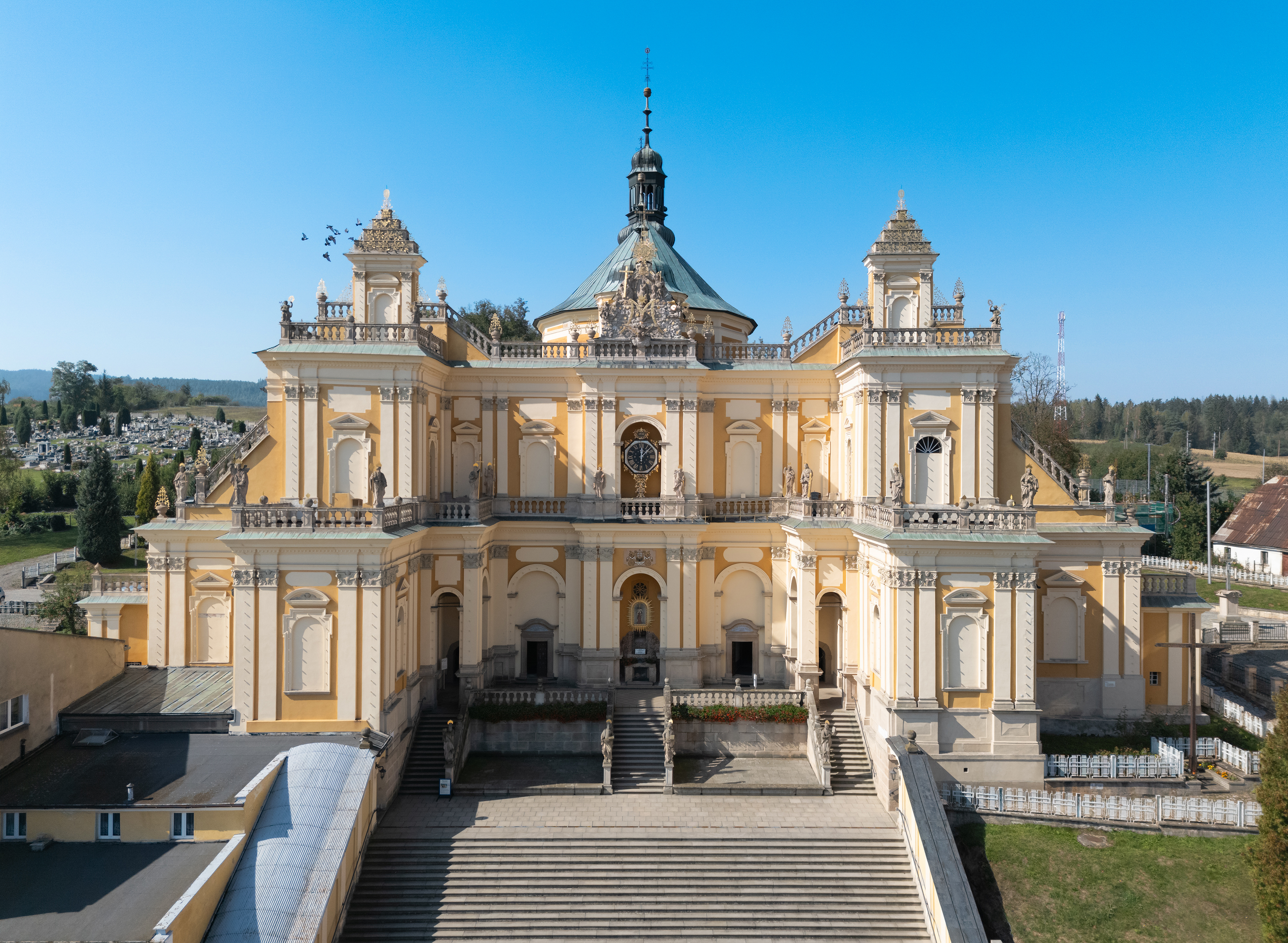
Basilica of the Visitation

The wooden statue of Our Lady, dating from the thirteenth century, was originally placed in a mighty linden tree located at this site. According to the legend a blind man regained his eyesight after praying before the statue. After that miracle a stone altar was erected in front of the tree. The first wooden chapel was built in 1263. A larger church was built in 1512 but was destroyed during the Thirty Years' War. The present pilgrimage Church of the Visitation of Our Lady goes back to a church built in 1695–1710 following a design thought to resemble the Temple in Jerusalem. However, all but the mighty Renaissance façade had to be torn down already three years later because the structure had become unsafe. The fourth and present church in Baroque style was then built 1715–1723, and financed by the local nobleman and owner Count Franz Anton von Götzen. Around the church and village a huge calvary (a set of chapels dedicated to the Passion of Christ) was built. In 1936 the church received the status of a 'Basilica minor' from Pope Pius XI. Pope John Paul II awarded the Madonna of Wambierzyce the title of "Queen of Families" in 1980. It is nicknamed the "Silesian Jerusalem".

== Sports ==
The local football club is WLKS Wambierzyce. It competes in the lower leagues.

== See also ==
- Basilica of the Visitation, Wambierzyce
- Tourism in Poland
