= Czech Corner =

Restaurant and pub in Prague

The Czech Corner (Czech: Český koutek, Polish: Czeski kątek, German: Böhmischer Winkel) is a territory found in the western end of Klodzko land, close to the current Czech–Polish border. This area consisted of eleven villages which were inhabited by Bohemian Czechs.

== List of settlements in the Czech Corner ==
In the Czech corner of one of the following municipalities:

- Slané (Polish Słone, formerly German Schlaney)
- Březová (Polish Brzozowie)
- Velká Čermná (Polish Czermna, formerly German Tscherbeney)
- Žakš (Polish Zakrze, formerly German Sackisch)
- Lázně Chudoba (Polish Kudowa-Zdrój, formerly German Bad Kudowa)
- Blažejov (Polish Błażejów, formerly German Blasewei)
- Jakubovice (Polish Jakubowice, formerly German Jakobowitz)
- Stroužné (Polish Pstrążna, formerly German Straußeney)
- Bukovina (Polish Bukowina (Kłodzka), formerly German Bukowine)
- Nouzín (Polish Ostra Góra, formerly German Nauseney)
- Ostra Hora (Polish Ostra Góra (partially))

== History ==
=== Beginnings ===
The area was likely under the rule of Great Moravia under King Svatopluk I by the late 9th century, though the precise extent of his realm is disputed. According to the Chronica Boëmorum from 1191 by Cosmas of Prague, the castle of Kłodzko on the road from Prague to Wrocław in 981 was a possession of the Bohemian nobleman Slavník, the father of Saint Adalbert of Prague.

During the rivalry between the Přemyslid dukes Boleslaus III and Jaromir in 1003, the Polish king Bolesław I Chrobry invaded Bohemia, but had to pull back the next year, facing the forces of King Henry II of Germany. In turn the Bohemian duke Bretislaus I campaigned the adjacent northern territory of Silesia after Bolesław's death in 1025. An armistice mediated by Henry II, Holy Roman Emperor since 1014, demarcated the spheres of influence, leaving the area around Kłodzko with Bohemia.

When about 1080 the Polish Piast duke Władysław I Herman married Judith Přemyslovna, daughter of Duke Vratislaus II of Bohemia, he received Kłodzko as a Bohemian fief, which upon his death in 1102 was claimed by his son Duke Bolesław III Wrymouth of Poland. However, as Bolesław became entangled in a fierce inheritance conflict with Duke Svatopluk of Bohemia and his cousin Borivoj II and campaigned in the Bohemian lands several times, he finally had to renounce Kłodzko in favour of Duke Soběslav I of Bohemia in a peace treaty signed in 1137 under pressure from Emperor Lothair III.

=== County of Kladsko ===
In 1458 under Bohemian rule the area around Kłodzko became a county. In 1742 it was conquered by Prussia. In 1816 the county was abolished, and the territory was reformed into the Landkreis Glatz of Prussian Silesia.

=== Claim by Czechoslovakia ===
After World War I the new Czechoslovak state laid claim to the County of Kladsko. Each one of the proposals put forth by the Czechoslovak delegation included annexing the Czech Corner to Czechoslovakia. These claims were however ultimately rejected by the 1919 Treaty of Versailles.

Proposals by the Czechoslovak Delegation on incorporating Kłodzko Land into Czechoslovakia during the Paris Peace Conference, 1919

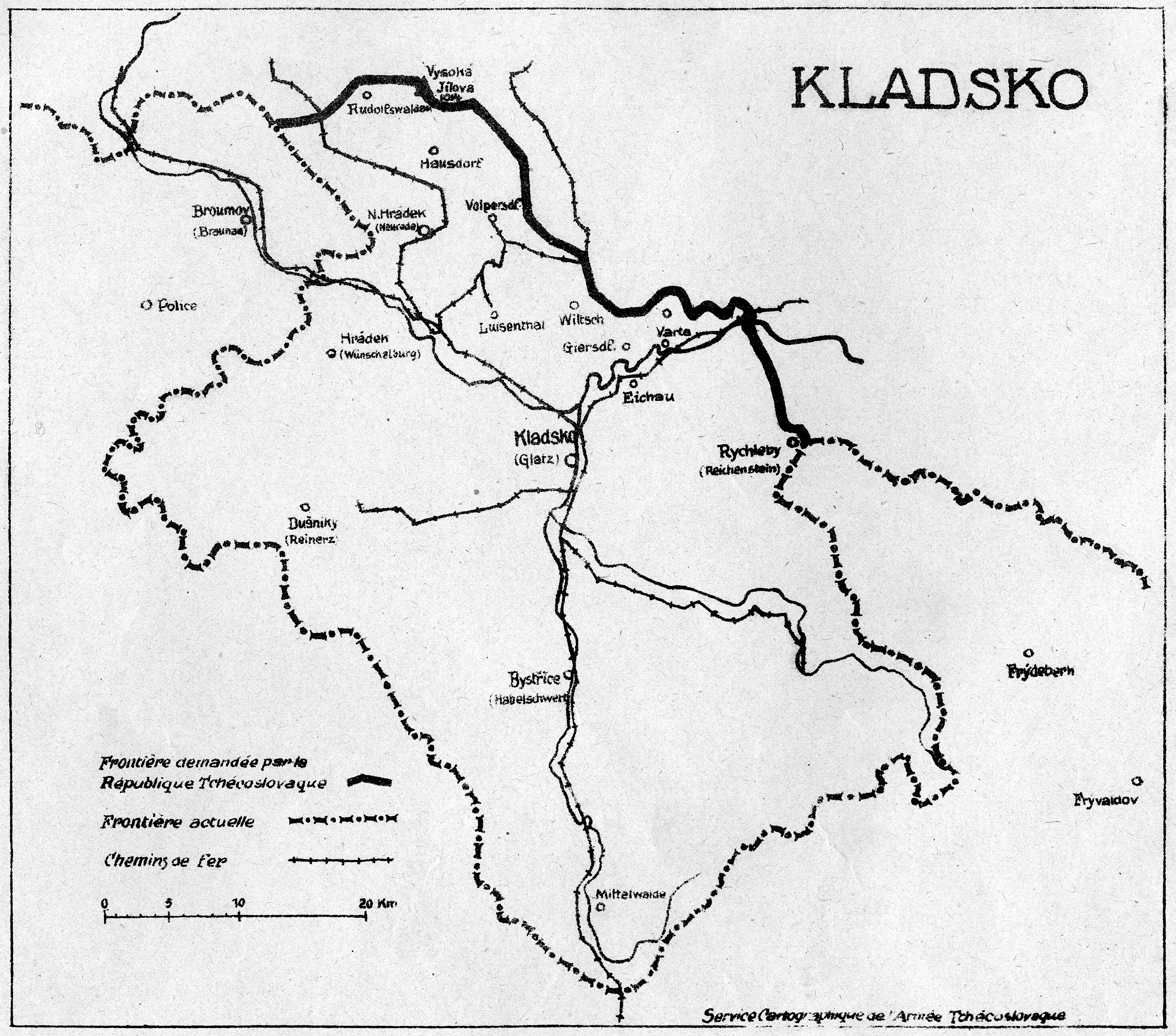
The maximalist variant

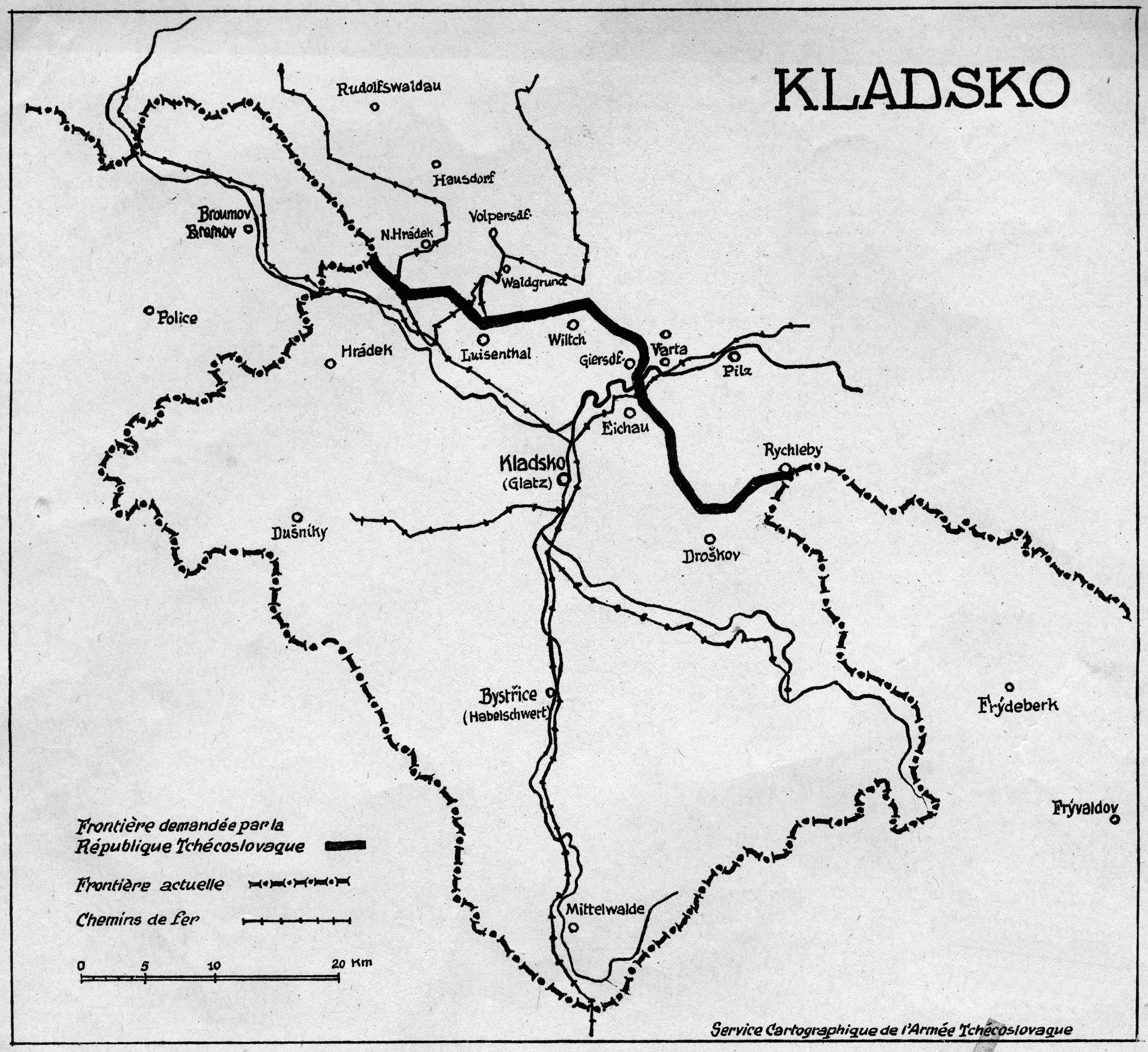
The intermediate variant

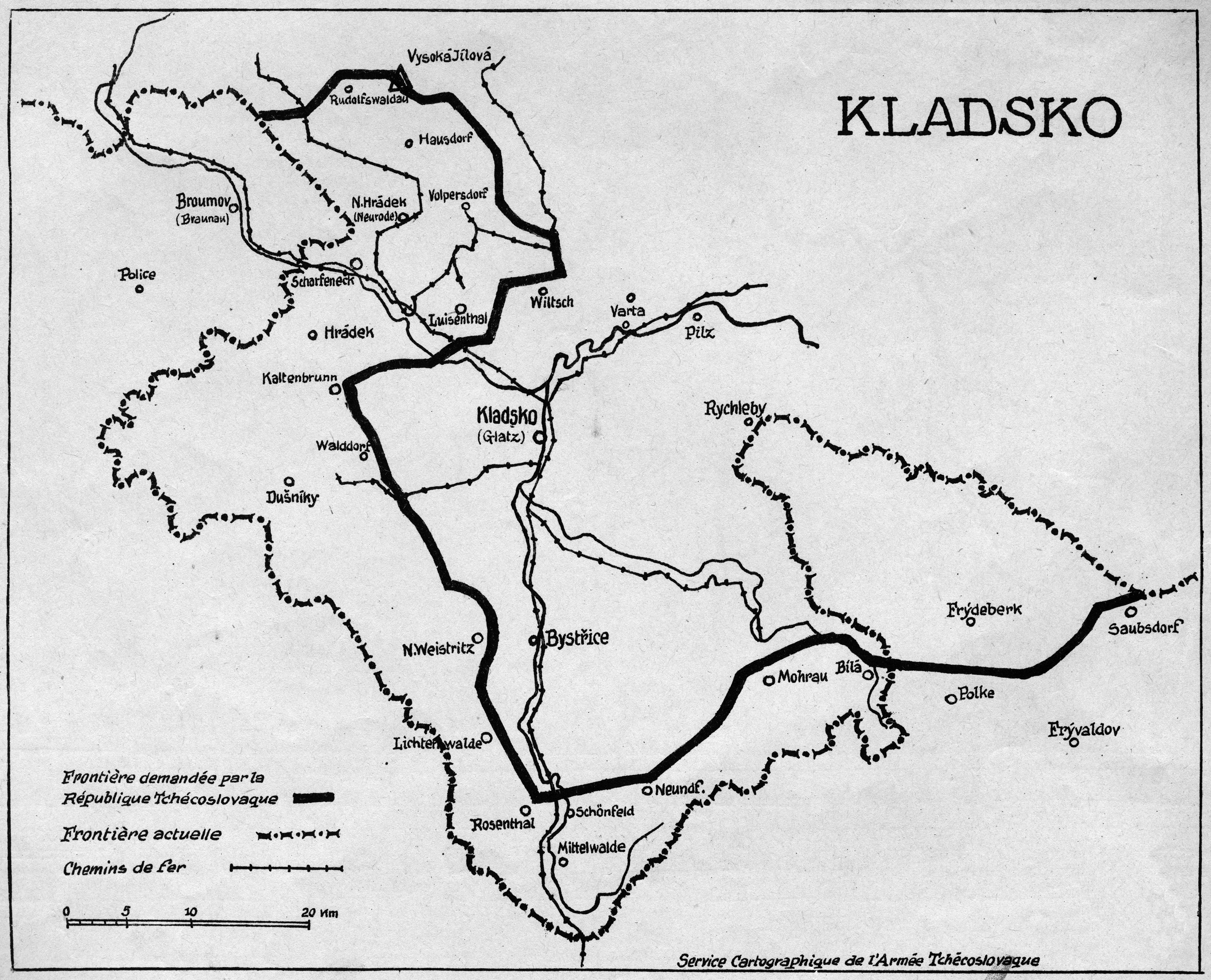
The minimalist variant

=== Incorporation into Poland ===
With the implementation of the Oder-Neisse line at the Potsdam Conference in 1945, most of the territory of Prussian Silesia including both Kłodzko, referred to as "Little Prague" (German: Klein-Prag) and the Czech Corner became part of the Republic of Poland.

Kłodzko land again became the focus of an attempt to reincorporate the area into Czechoslovakia, one of several Polish–Czechoslovak border conflicts when in May 1945 Czechoslovakia tried to annex the area on behalf of the Czech minority present in the Czech Corner. Pressure brought on by the Soviet Union ultimately led to a ceasing of military operations.

The Czech population quickly began to decline as a result of emigration to the Czechoslovakia and the Federal Republic of Germany. While just after World War II the Czech population of the Czech Corner was approximately 5,100 persons, in 1957 estimates were of about 500 Czechs remaining. The vast majority of inhabitants of the Czech corner today are ethnic Poles.

According to canon law, the area was part of the Roman Catholic Archdiocese of Prague until 1972.

Capitalizing on interest regarding Czech Corner and the Kladsko area in the Czech national psyche, a special tourist area in the Náchod District has been designated as the Kladsko Borderland Tourist Area (tourism district; Czech: turistická oblast Kladské pomezí). This area, entirely within the Czech Republic, was formerly known as the Jirásek's Region (Czech: Jiráskův kraj), Adršpach rocks (Czech: Adršpašské skály).
