= Basilica of the Visitation, Wambierzyce =

Basilica of the Visitation in Wambierzyce
- Bazylika Nawiedzenia Najświętszej Marii Panny
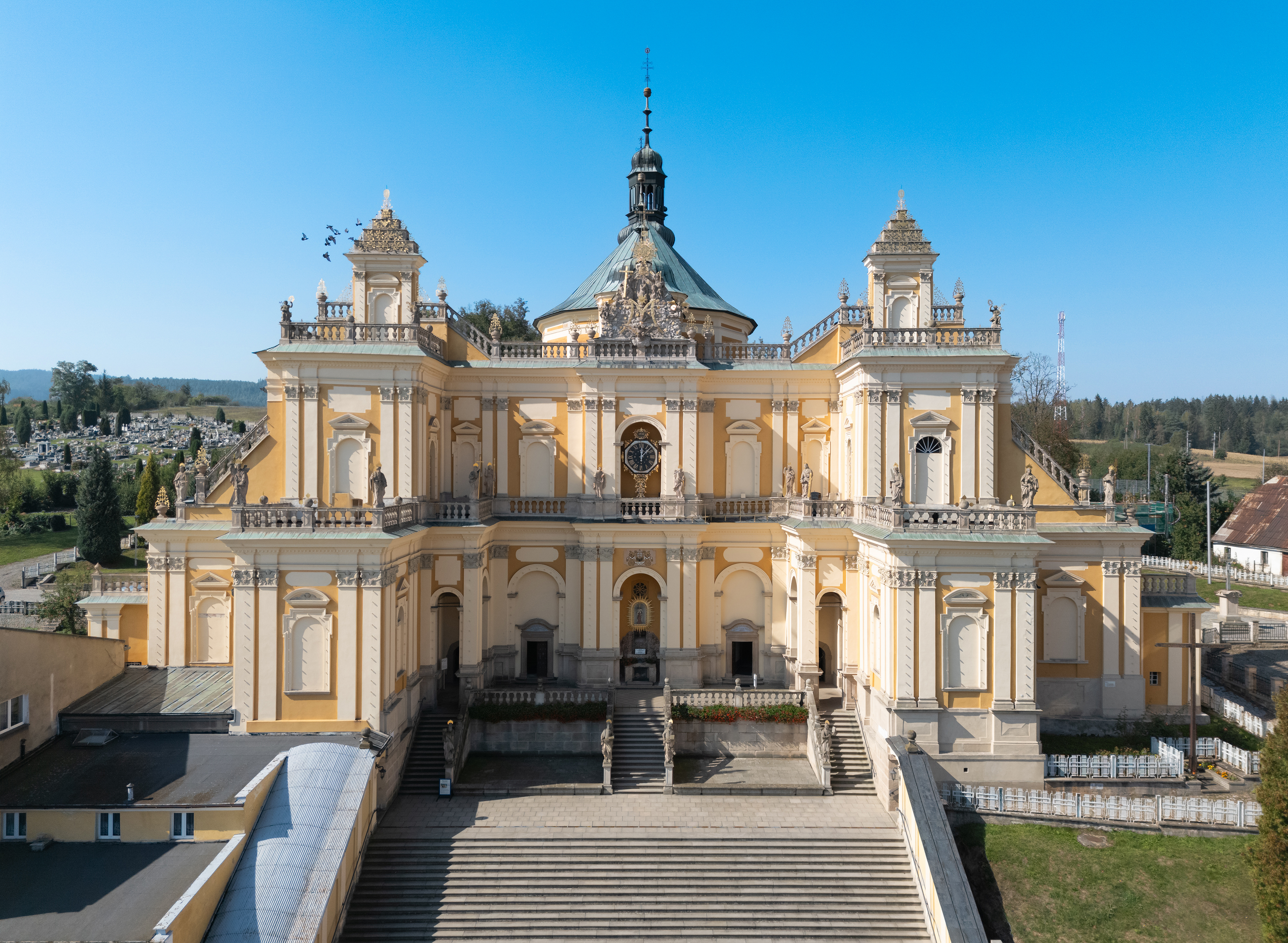

- 50.2924°N 16.2717°E
- Location: Wambierzyce
- Country: Poland
- Language: Polish
- Denomination: Catholic

History
- Status: Basilica
- Dedication: Visitation of Mary

Architecture
- Functional status: Active
- Heritage designation: Cultural heritage site
- Designated: 2 January 1950
- Style: Baroque
- Years built: 1715–1723

Administration
- Diocese: Świdnica
- Deanery: Nowa Ruda-Słupiec
- Parish: Visitation of Mary Parish in Wambierzyce

Basilica of the Visitation (Polish: Bazylika Nawiedzenia Najświętszej Marii Panny, Sanktuarium Wambierzyckiej Królowej Rodzin, German: Basilika Mariä Heimsuchung) is a Baroque basilica minor located in Wambierzyce, Poland. The basilica was built between 1715 and 1723. It was given the status of a basilica minor by Pope Pius XI in 1936.

== History ==
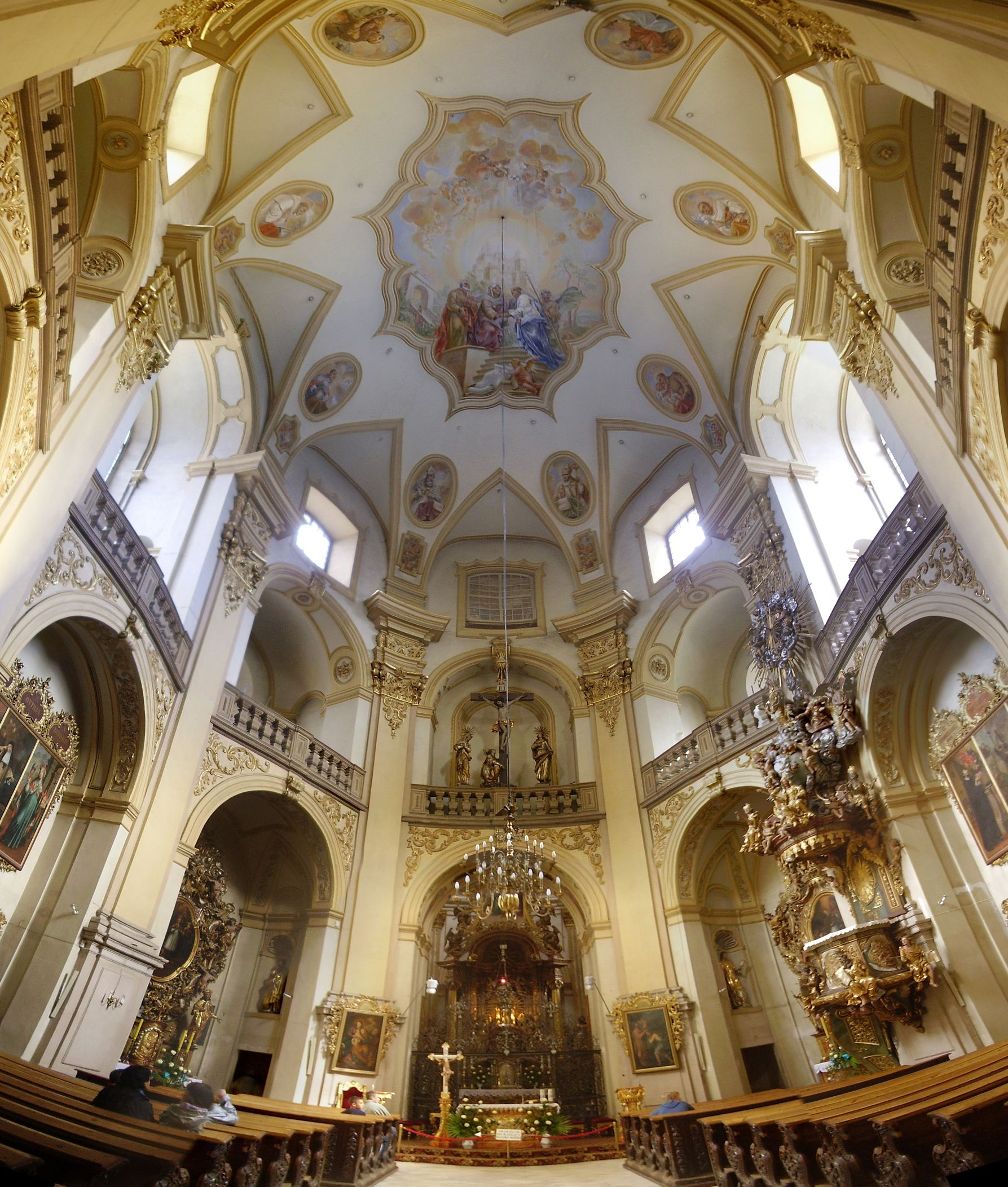
Interior of the basilica.

The present basilica is located on a hill, where in the twelfth-century, stood a wooden figure of Mary, the Mother of God. According to a chronicle from 1218, the blind Jan from Raszewo (Jan z Raszewa) regained his sight there. After the event, many pilgrims began visiting the area. Shortly afterwards, an altar, together with candlesticks and a baptismal font, was placed by the statue under the tree. In 1263, a wooden church was built on the hill.

In 1512, Ludwik von Panwitz raised a greater church, constructed out of brick. However, the church was destroyed during the Thirty Years' War. Between 1695 and 1711, a new church was built, but quickly began to crumble and was deconstructed in 1714. Between 1715 and 1723, another church was built by Count Franciszek Antony von Goetzen, which stands to the present day. In 1936, Pope Pius XI gave the basilica the status of basilica minor. In August 1987, Cardinal Stefan Wyszyński had crowned the statue of Mary, the Mother of God, giving her the name of Wambierzyce Queen of Families (Wambierzycka Królowa Rodzin).
