= Radków =

Town in Lower Silesian Voivodeship, Poland

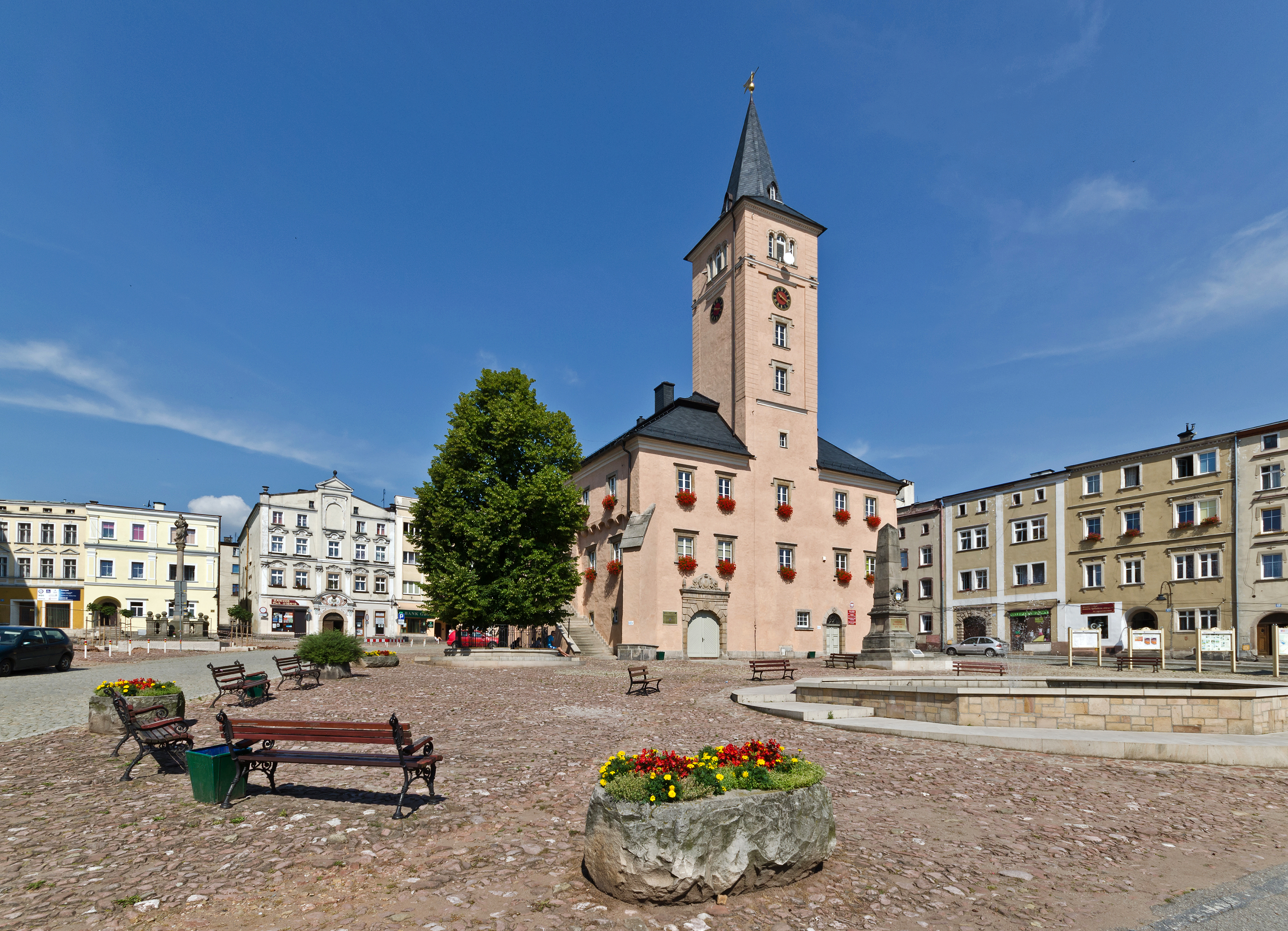
- Market Square (Rynek) with the Renaissance town hall

- Flag Coat of arms

- Location within Poland
- Coordinates: 50°30′14″N 16°24′12″E
- Country: Poland
- Voivodeship: Lower Silesian
- County: Kłodzko
- Gmina: Radków
- First mentioned: 1290
- Town rights: 14th century

Area
  - Total: 15.03 km^{2} (5.80 sq mi)

Population (2019-06-30)
  - Total: 2,406
  - Density: 160.1/km^{2} (414.6/sq mi)
- Time zone: UTC+1 (CET)
  - Summer (DST): UTC+2 (CEST)
- Vehicle registration: DKL
- Website: http://www.radkowklodzki.pl/

Radków [ˈratkuf] (German: Wünschelburg) is a town in Kłodzko County, Lower Silesian Voivodeship, in south-western Poland. It is the seat of the administrative district (gmina) called Gmina Radków, close to the Czech border. As at 2019, the town has a population of 2,406.

== Geography ==
It lies in the Kłodzko Valley at the foot of the Table Mountains. It is located within the historic Kłodzko Land.

== History ==
The settlement probably already existed in the 11th century. In the High Middle Ages, together with the Kłodzko Land, it changed affiliation several times, passing between Poland and Bohemia. A church at the site was first mentioned in 1290. That same year, after the death of Polish duke Henryk IV Probus Kłodzko Land passed to Bohemia. It was granted town rights around 1320-1333. From 1327 to 1341 it was placed under the rule of Polish dukes from the Piast dynasty (within the duchies of Wrocław and Ziębice) and in 1348 it was incorporated to the Bohemian Crown Lands. By 1373 the town had a mayor and in the early 15th century defensive walls were built. Then in 1418 it received new privileges from King Wenceslaus IV, which equated its town rights with those of Kłodzko and granted the title of a royal city. In the following decades, the town was devastated by Hussite troops in 1425 as well as by the Hungarian forces of king Matthias Corvinus in 1469. In the 15th century, crafts flourished, local cloths were exported to other countries, while 85 of all 86 houses had the right to brew beer.

With the County of Kladsko, it turned Protestant by the mid-16th century and was affected by the Counter-Reformation in the Habsburg monarchy as well as the devastations of the Thirty Years' War, when it was captured by the Austrians in 1621, the Swedes in 1632, and it was struck by epidemics in 1625 and 1633. In the First Silesian War (1740–42), the town was conquered and annexed by King Frederick II of Prussia. The picturesque setting attracted Johann Wolfgang von Goethe, who spent a few days here in August 1790.

From 1815 onwards, it was incorporated into the Prussian Silesia Province. From the late 19th century onwards, the Wünschelburg sandstone pits supplied notable buildings like the Berlin Reichstag via the new Eulengebirgsbahn railway line to Ścinawka Średnia (then Mittelsteine). After the defeat of Nazi Germany in World War II, the area fell to the Republic of Poland according to the 1945 Potsdam Agreement, while the German population was expelled. Nowadays the population is overwhelmingly Polish.

== Notable people ==
- Wolfgang Stumph (born 1946), German actor
