= Friedrich Wilhelm von Götzen the Younger =

Prussian general (1767–1820)

Friedrich Wilhelm von Götzen (the younger; 1767-1820) was a Prussian general.

== Biography ==
He was born at Potsdam. He entered the army in 1783, and was appointed major on the general staff in 1801. He had the fullest confidence of King Frederick William III, who appointed him his chief adjutant in 1804, and at whose request he was sent to organize the defense of Silesia. As governor general of that province, he displayed extraordinary patriotism during the critical period of the Napoleonic invasion, and was chiefly instrumental, by his skill and persistent energy, in saving that province to the Prussian crown.
