= Silesian Institute in Katowice =

Polish scientific organization

The Silesian Institute in Katowice (Polish: Instytut Śląski w Katowicach) was a regional scientific organization collecting local information about the region of Silesia, working in Katowice from 1934 to 1939 and 1945 to 1949, and during the Nazi occupation of Poland during World War II (1939 to 1945) as an underground movement in Warschau, Krakau and Lemburg.

Between 1945 and 1948, the Silesian Institute founded branches in Wrocław and Kłodzko and also the Jerzy Bandtkie Library in Cieplice Śląskie-Zdrój. During reorganization in 1948, the Silesian Institute became part of the Western Institute in Poznań.

The works and tradition of the Silesian Institute are continued by the Silesian Institute in Opole (Instytut Śląski w Opolu) established in 1957 and the Silesian Scientific Institute in Katowice (Śląski Instutut Naukowy w Katowicach) established in 1958. Designed by Stanislaw Kwasniewicz, the Silesian Scientific Institute building located at 32 Graniczna Street was representative of an architectural style known as Katowice brutalism. It was demolished in 2022.
