= Scharfeneck =

Scharfeneck may refer to:

- Schloss Scharfeneck, now Sarny Court and Park, Poland
- Burg Scharfeneck, Austria
- Alt-Scharfeneck Castle ("Old Scharfeneck castle"), West Germany
- Neuscharfeneck Castle ("New Scharfeneck castle"), West Germany
- Former name of hamlet Sarny, Lower Silesian Voivodeship, now attached to Ścinawka Górna, Poland
