= Gmina Radków, Lower Silesian Voivodeship =

Gmina Radków Radków Commune
- Gmina
- Flag Coat of arms
- Interactive map of Gmina Radków
- Coordinates (Radków): 50°30′14″N 16°24′12″E
- Country: Poland
- Voivodeship: Lower Silesian
- County: Kłodzko
- Seat: Radków
- Sołectwos: Gajów, Karłów-Pasterka, Raszków, Ratno Dolne, Ratno Górne, Ścinawka Dolna, Ścinawka Górna, Ścinawka Średnia, Suszyna, Tłumaczów, Wambierzyce

Area
  - Total: 139 km^{2} (54 sq mi)

Population (2019-06-30)
  - Total: 9,048
  - Density: 65.1/km^{2} (169/sq mi)
- Website: http://www.radkowklodzki.pl/

Gmina Radków is an urban-rural gmina (administrative district) in Kłodzko County, Lower Silesian Voivodeship, in south-western Poland. Its seat is the town of Radków, which lies approximately 20 kilometres (12 mi) north-west of Kłodzko, and 83 kilometres (52 mi) south-west of the regional capital Wrocław.

The gmina covers an area of 139 square kilometres (53.7 sq mi), and as of 2019 its total population is 9,048.

== Neighbouring gminas ==
Gmina Radków is bordered by the town of Kudowa-Zdrój and the gminas of Kłodzko, Nowa Ruda and Szczytna. It also borders the Czech Republic.

== Villages ==
Apart from the town of Radków, the gmina contains the villages of Gajów, Karłów, Pasterka, Raszków, Ratno Dolne, Ratno Górne, Ścinawka Dolna, Ścinawka Górna, Ścinawka Średnia, Suszyna, Tłumaczów and Wambierzyce.

== Twin towns – sister cities ==
Gmina Radków is twinned with:

- Pniewy, Poland
- Radków, Poland
- Zadzim, Poland
- Adršpach, Czech Republic
- Bezděkov nad Metují, Czech Republic
- Bukovice, Czech Republic
- Dobruška, Czech Republic
- Hejtmánkovice, Czech Republic
- Hynčice, Czech Republic
- Křinice, Czech Republic
- Machov, Czech Republic
- Martinkovice, Czech Republic
- Meziměstí, Czech Republic
- Opočno, Czech Republic
- Otovice, Czech Republic
- Police nad Metují, Czech Republic
- Šonov, Czech Republic
- Suchý Důl, Czech Republic
- Velké Petrovice, Czech Republic
- Žďár nad Metují, Czech Republic
- Anröchte, Germany
- Schöpstal, Germany
