= Machov =

- Market town
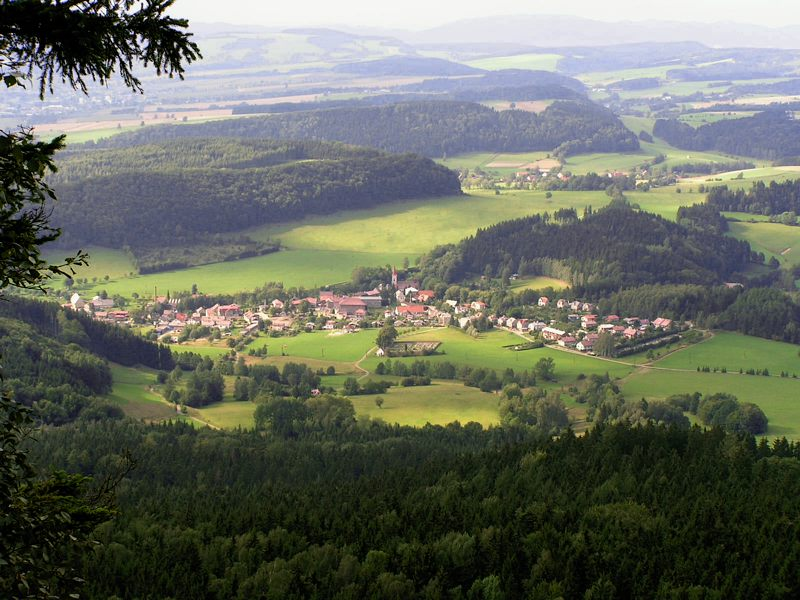
- General view of Machov

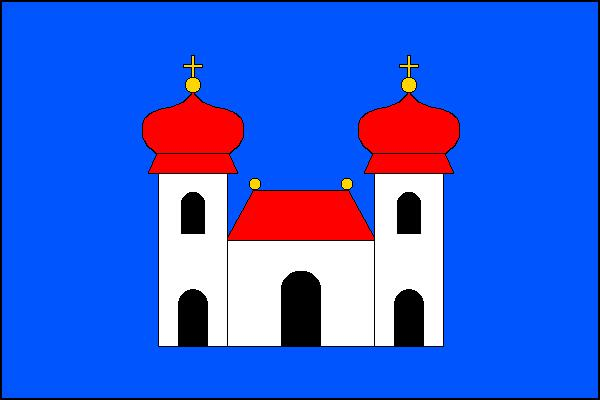
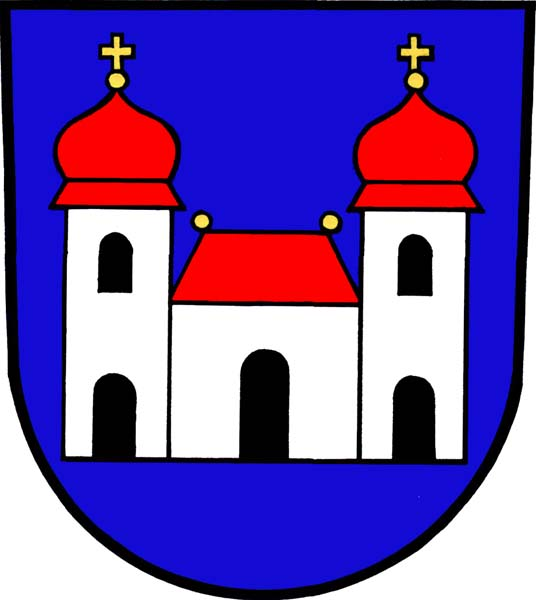
- Flag Coat of arms

- Location in the Czech Republic
- Coordinates: 50°29′57″N 16°16′37″E
- Country: Czech Republic
- Region: Hradec Králové
- District: Náchod
- First mentioned: 1354

Area
  - Total: 19.39 km^{2} (7.49 sq mi)
- Elevation: 450 m (1,480 ft)

Population (2026-01-01)
  - Total: 1,052
  - Density: 54.25/km^{2} (140.5/sq mi)
- Time zone: UTC+1 (CET)
  - Summer (DST): UTC+2 (CEST)
- Postal codes: 549 31, 549 63
- Website: www.machov-obec.cz

Machov (Czech pronunciation: [ˈmaxof]; German: Machau) is a market town in Náchod District in the Hradec Králové Region of the Czech Republic. It has about 1,100 inhabitants.

== Administrative division ==
Machov consists of four municipal parts (in brackets population according to the 2021 census):

- Machov (492)
- Bělý (123)
- Machovská Lhota (109)
- Nízká Srbská (318)

== Etymology ==
The name is derived from the personal name Mach, meaning "Mach's (court)".

== Geography ==
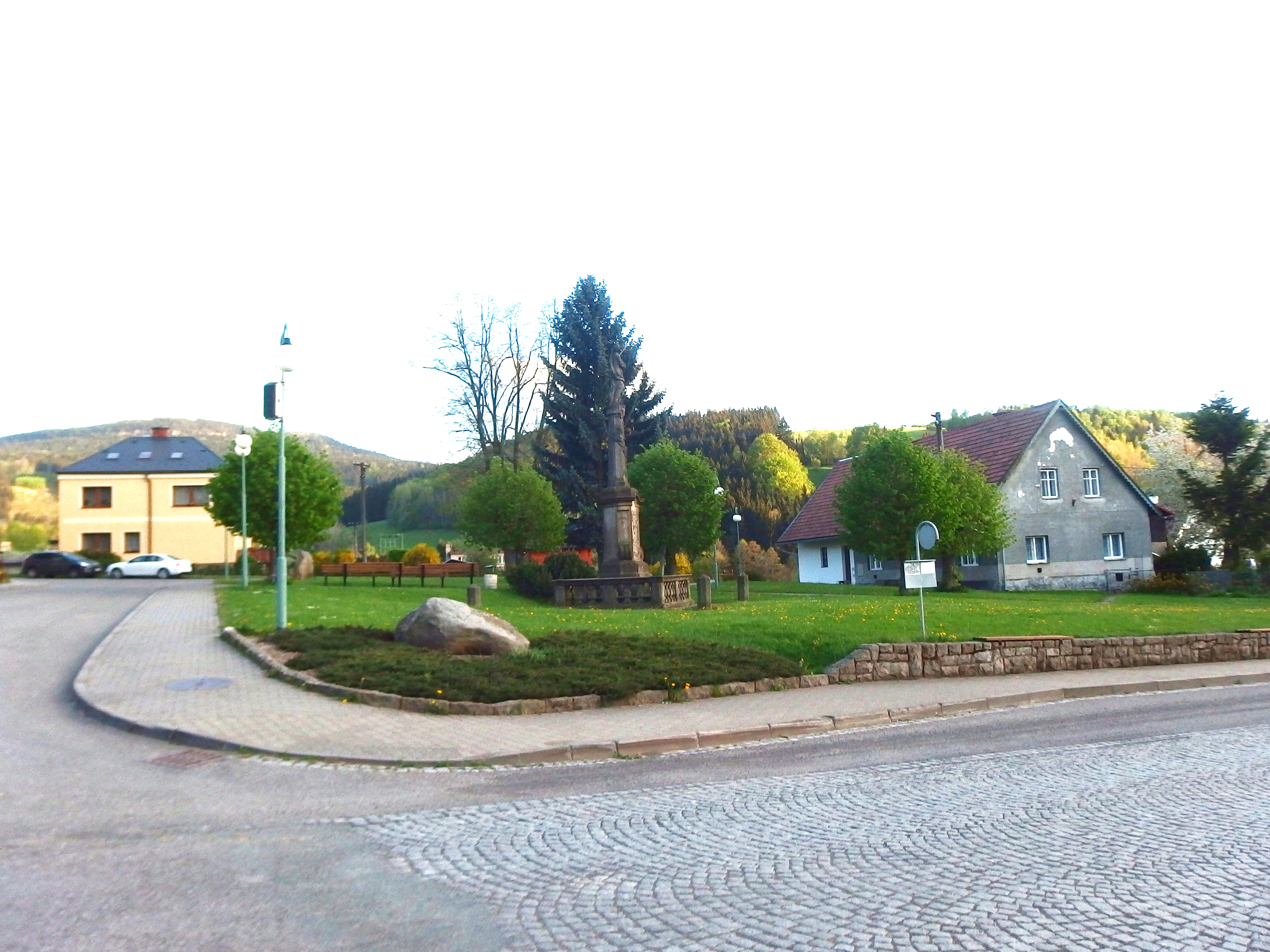
Town square in Machov

Machov is located about 12 kilometres (7 mi) northeast of Náchod and 29 km (18 mi) south of the Polish city of Wałbrzych, on the border with Poland. It lies in the Broumov Highlands. Machov, Machovská Lhota and Nízká Srbská lie in the valley of the Židovka Brook. Bělý lies on the Třeslice Brook, which flows into the Židovka in Nízká Srbská.

Machov entirely lies in the Broumovsko Protected Landscape Area. Near Machov, there are important resources of drinking water thanks to a geological substratum that filters rain water.

== History ==
The first written mention of Machov is from 1354. It was probably founded during the colonisation of this region in the 13th century. In 1465, it is first referred to as a market town. In 1545, it became a part of the large Náchod estate. The most significant owner of Machov was Ottavio Piccolomini, during whose cruel rule began the discontent of the population leading to a peasant uprising in 1775.

== Demographics ==
Historical population

Year	Pop.	±%
1869	2,480	—
1880	2,510	+1.2%
1890	2,441	−2.7%
1900	2,255	−7.6%
1910	2,113	−6.3%

Year	Pop.	±%
1921	1,890	−10.6%
1930	1,884	−0.3%
1950	1,489	−21.0%
1961	1,358	−8.8%
1970	1,238	−8.8%

Year	Pop.	±%
1980	1,186	−4.2%
1991	1,147	−3.3%
2001	1,112	−3.1%
2011	1,074	−3.4%
2021	1,042	−3.0%

Source: Censuses

== Transport ==
On the Czech–Polish border is the road border crossing Machovská Lhota / Ostra Góra. There are no railways or major roads passing through the municipal territory.

== Sights ==
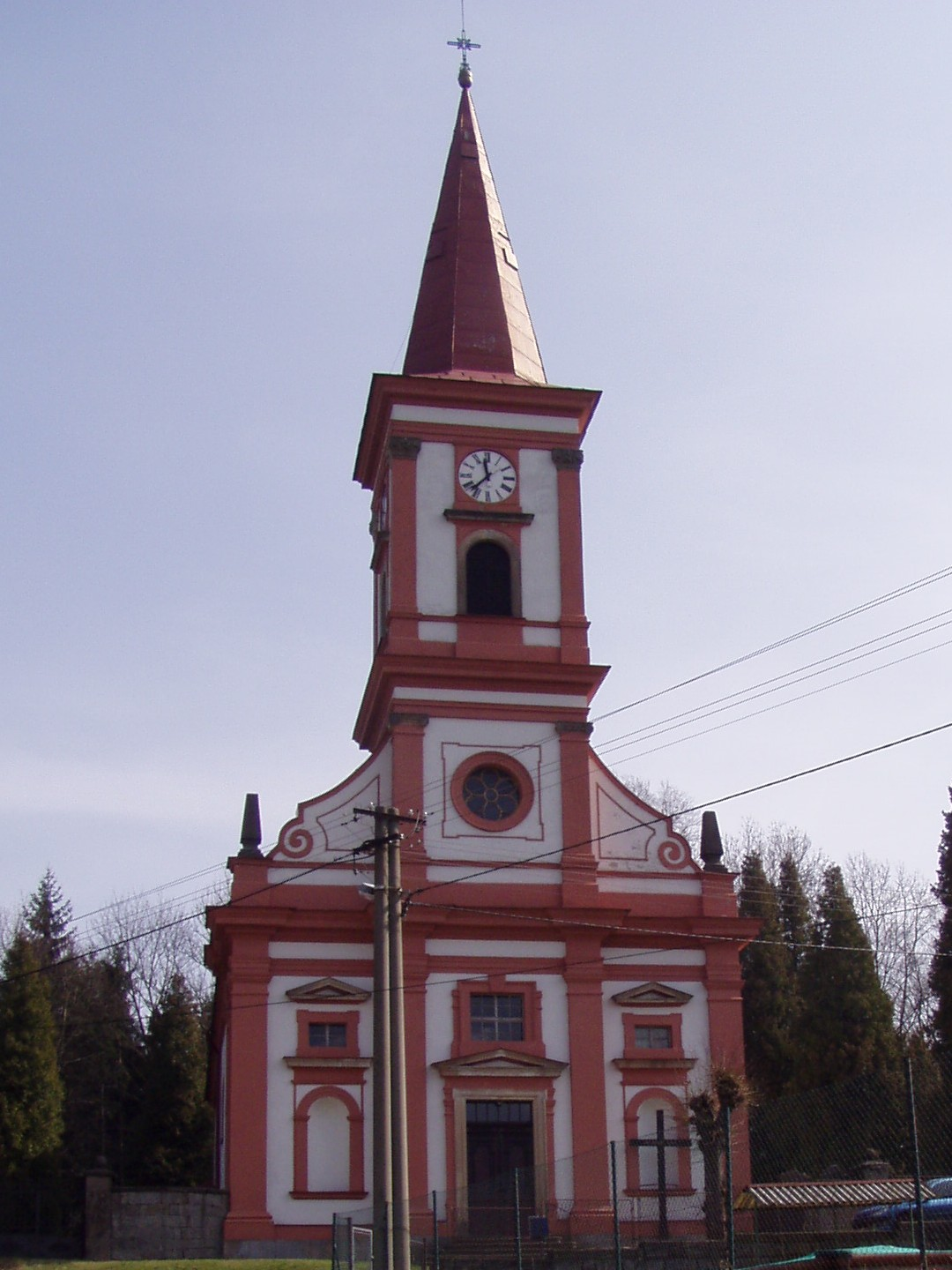
Church of Saint Wenceslaus

The Church of Saint Wenceslaus was originally a wooden church from the 14th century with a separate bell tower from 1586. This church fell into disrepair and was replaced by the current Baroque building in 1675. On the square there is a Baroque Marian column from 1761.

A protected small-leaved lime tree with estimated age of 500 years grows near the house No. 26.

In Nízká Srbská is a preserved smithy from 1799. In Machovská Lhota is a former evangelical rectory from 1813.

== Twin towns – sister cities ==
Machov is twinned with:

- Radków, Poland
