= Hynčice (Náchod District) =

- Municipality
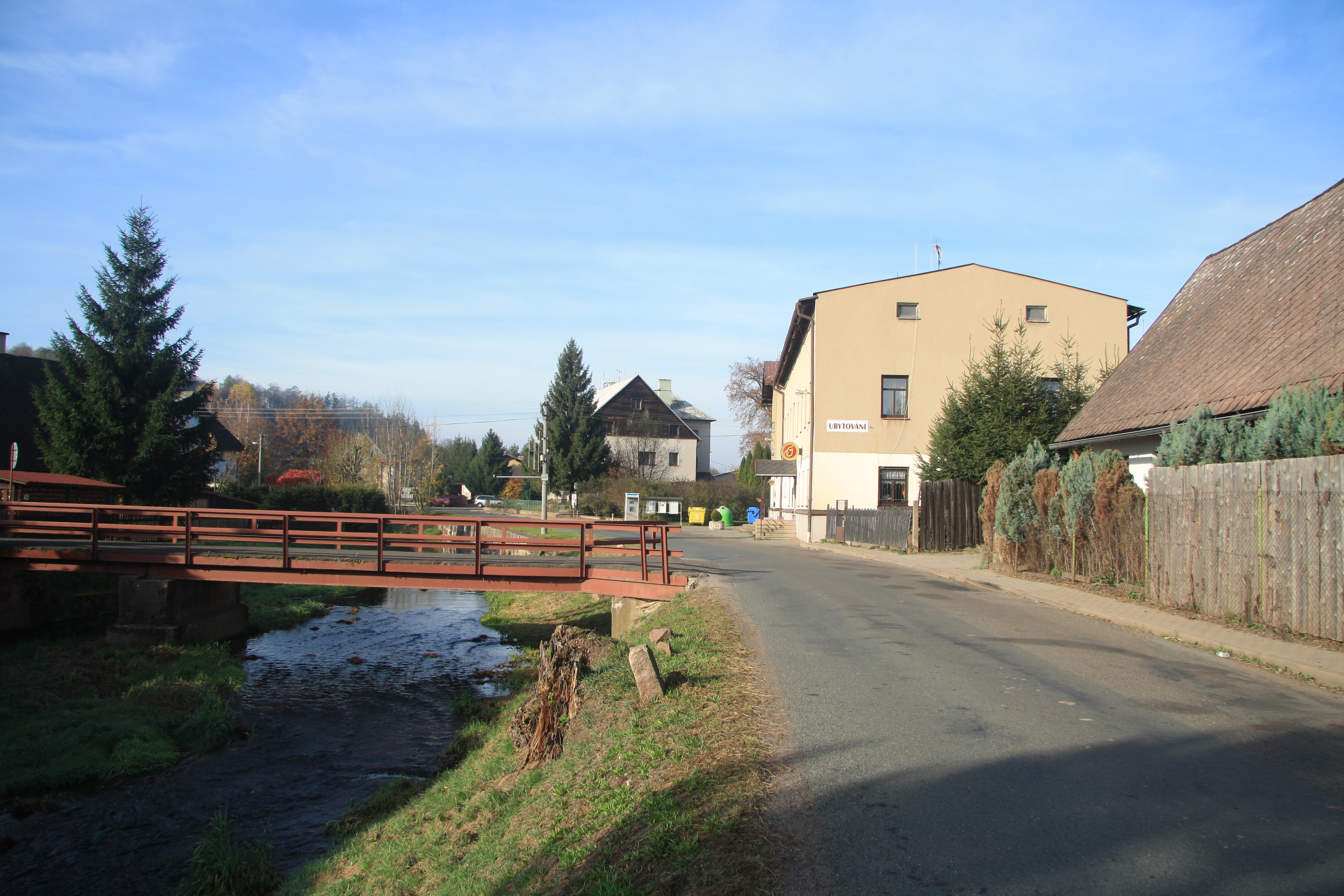
- Centre of Hynčice

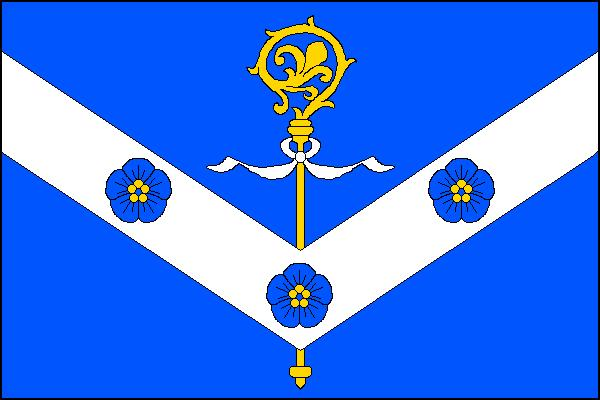
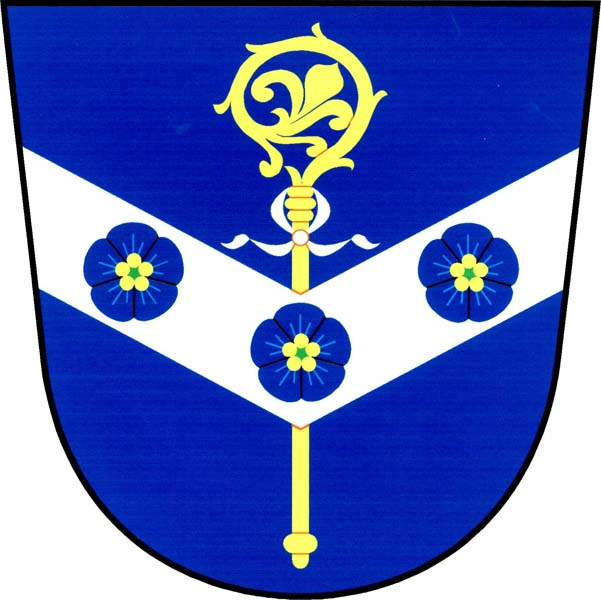
- Flag Coat of arms

- Location in the Czech Republic
- Coordinates: 50°37′26″N 16°17′7″E
- Country: Czech Republic
- Region: Hradec Králové
- District: Náchod
- First mentioned: 1255

Area
  - Total: 2.90 km^{2} (1.12 sq mi)
- Elevation: 416 m (1,365 ft)

Population (2026-01-01)
  - Total: 186
  - Density: 64.1/km^{2} (166/sq mi)
- Time zone: UTC+1 (CET)
  - Summer (DST): UTC+2 (CEST)
- Postal code: 549 83
- Website: www.obec-hyncice.cz

Hynčice (German: Heinzendorf) is a municipality and village in Náchod District in the Hradec Králové Region of the Czech Republic. It has about 200 inhabitants.

== Demographics ==
Historical population
| Year | Pop. | ±% |
|---|---|---|
| 1869 | 515 | — |
| 1880 | 540 | +4.9% |
| 1890 | 613 | +13.5% |
| 1900 | 871 | +42.1% |
| 1910 | 939 | +7.8% |
| 1921 | 750 | −20.1% |
| 1930 | 739 | −1.5% |
| 1950 | 357 | −51.7% |
| 1961 | 355 | −0.6% |
| 1970 | 300 | −15.5% |
| 1980 | 266 | −11.3% |
| 1991 | 207 | −22.2% |
| 2001 | 201 | −2.9% |
| 2011 | 189 | −6.0% |
| 2021 | 178 | −5.8% |
Source: Censuses

== Twin towns – sister cities ==
Hynčice is twinned with:

- Radków, Poland
