= Ratno Dolne =

- Village
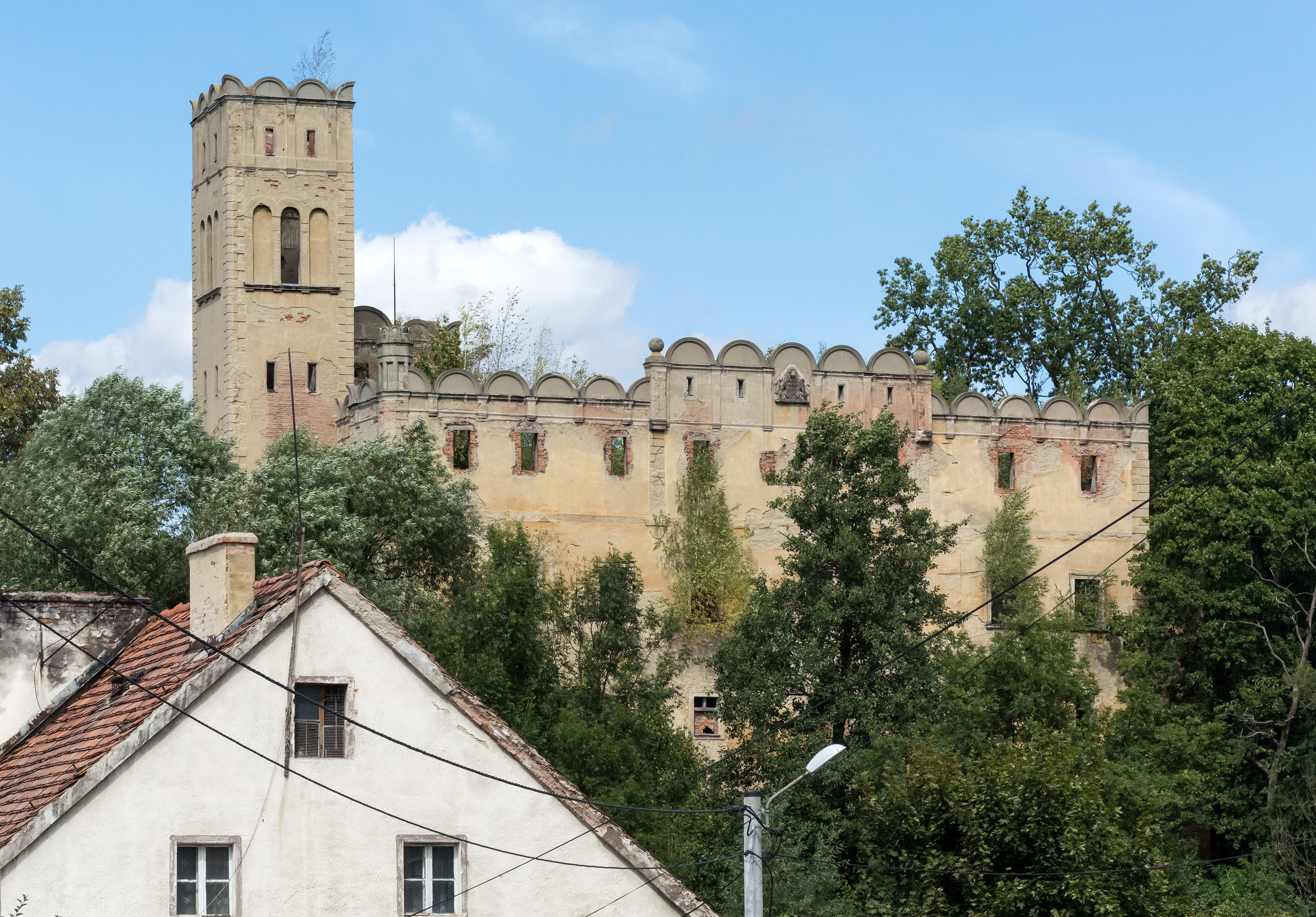
- Ratno Dolne Castle

- Location within Poland
- Coordinates: 50°30′N 16°26′E
- Country: Poland
- Voivodeship: Lower Silesian
- County: Kłodzko
- Gmina: Radków
- Postal code: 57-411
- Vehicle registration: DKL

Ratno Dolne [ˈratnɔ ˈdɔlnɛ] is a village in the administrative district of Gmina Radków, within Kłodzko County, Lower Silesian Voivodeship, in south-western Poland. It is situated on the Posna River, in the Kłodzko Land.
