= Suszyna =

- Village
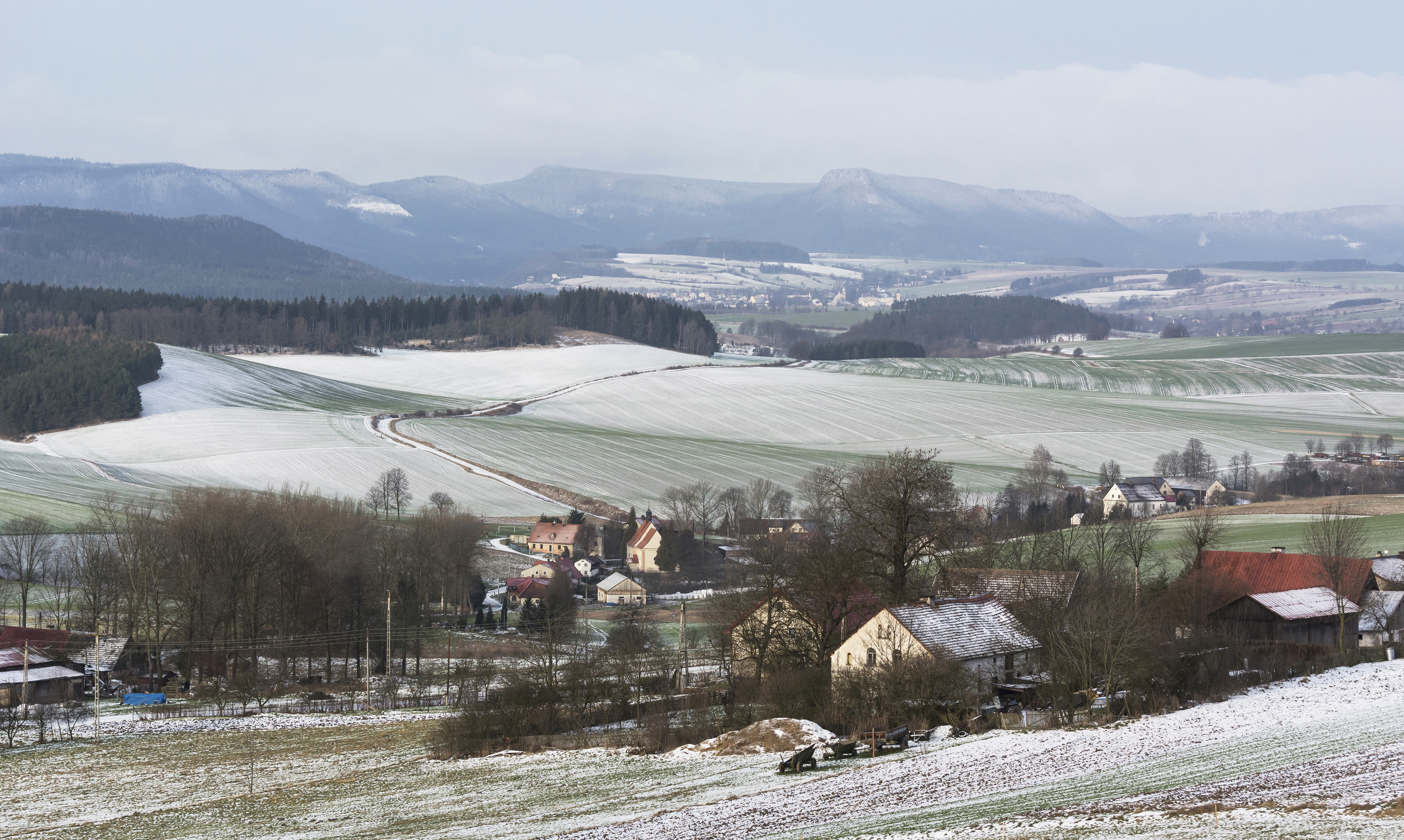
- General view

- Location within Poland
- Coordinates: 50°28′37″N 16°31′23″E
- Country: Poland
- Voivodeship: Lower Silesian
- County: Kłodzko
- Gmina: Radków
- Elevation: 380–415 m (1,247–1,362 ft)

Population
  - Total: 233

Suszyna [suˈʂɨna] (German:Dürrkunzendorf) is a village in the administrative district of Gmina Radków, within Kłodzko County, Lower Silesian Voivodeship, in southwest Poland. Between 1975 and 1998 the village belonged to the Wałbrzych Voivodeship

.

== Geography ==
It is a small chain village in the south-eastern part of the Ścinawskie Hills. It lies at an altitude of about 380–415 m above sea level, in a fairly deep valley through which a small stream flows. These hills are built of red-spotted slugde with melafir clusters. Minerals and precious stones found in Suszyna include amethyst and agate. High -quality graphite was extracted between 1830 and 1840 in Mrówieniec (German: Finkenhübel b. Seifersdorf), one of its hamlets.

== History ==
Suszyna (then Dürrkunzendorf) was first mentioned in 1353 as "czu dorryn Cunczendorf" and in 1384 as "Dorrenkunzendorf". It belonged to the Wünschelburg District in Glatzerland, which was a sub-country of the Kingdom of Bohemia .

After the Silesian Wars, Dürrkunzendorf, along with the County of Glatz, became part of Prussia in 1763 under the Treaty of Hubertusburg. After the reorganization of Prussia in 1815, it belonged to the province of Silesia. From 1816 to 1853 the village belonged to the county of Glatz, and from 1854 to 1932 to the county of Neurode. After the latter's dissolution in 1933, Dürrkunzendorf once again belonged to the district of Glatz. From 1874 it belonged to the district of Seifersdorf, along with the rural community of Seifersdorf and several nearby agricultural estates.

As a consequence of the Second World War, Dürrkunzendorf became part of Poland in 1945 and was renamed Suszyna. The German population was expelled in 1946. Some of the new inhabitants were brought from Eastern Poland.

== Demography ==
After World War II, the German population was expelled and replaced by Poles; according to data from 1947, they came from the voivodeships of Kraków (203 people), Lwów (83 people) and Tarnopol (66 people). The village lost its function as a resort, and its airport and glider school were devastated. As a result, the village's population declined, and it is now mainly agricultural. According to the National Census of March 2011, it had 233 inhabitants.

== Observation tower ==
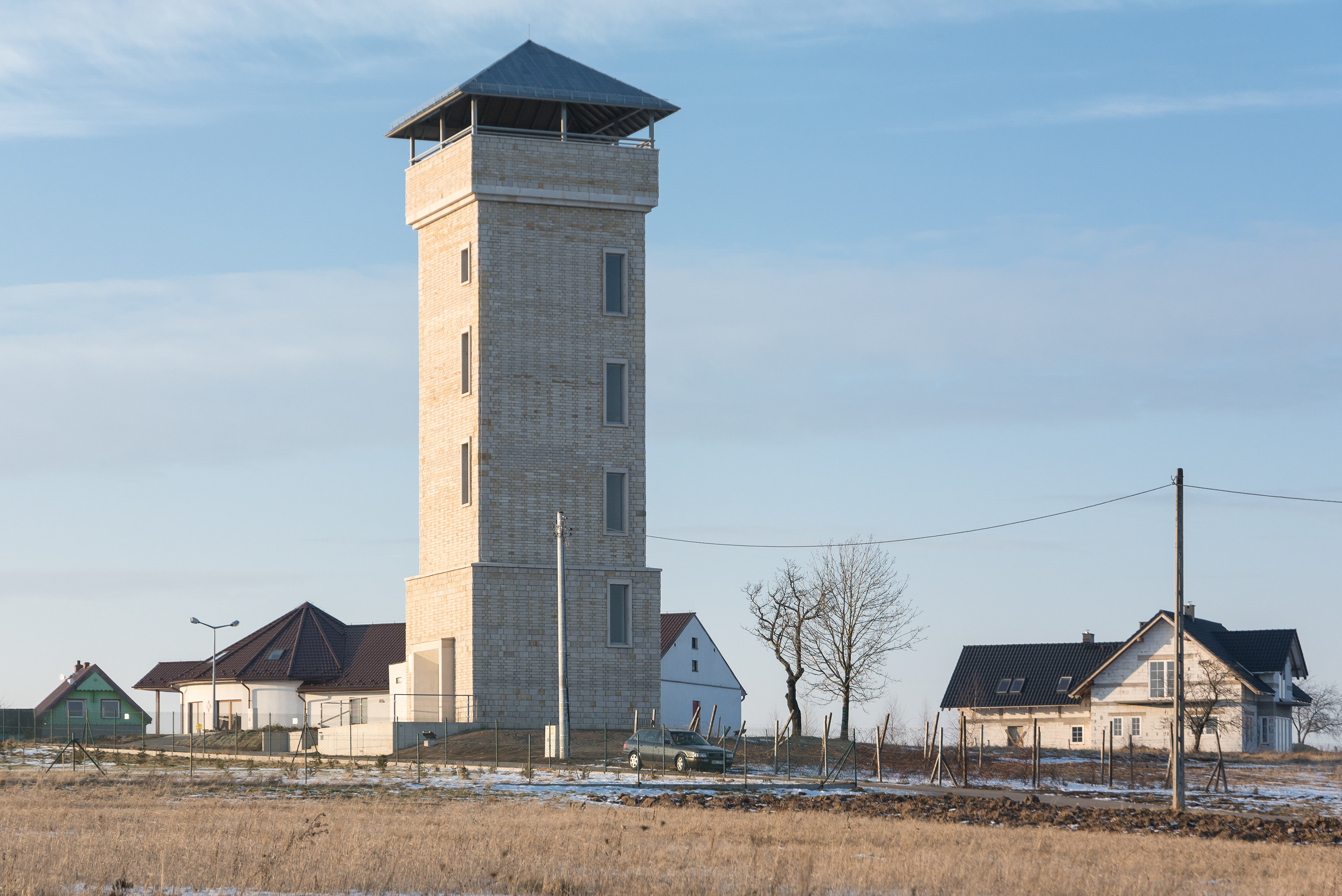
Observation tower in Suszyna

The 27-meter Suszynka tower stands on a hill 469.2 m above sea level in the south-eastern part of the Ścinawskie Hills. A viewing platform at a height of 22 meters is reached by 140 stairs. The inner cross-section of the tower is six meters. The tower is reinforced and lined with sandstone both externally and internally.

The tower was co-financed by the Czech Republic - Republic of Poland 2007-2013 Cross-border Cooperation Operational Program under the project "Glacensis Euroregion". Construction cost about one million zlotys.
