= Emanuel Aloys Förster =

Prussian composer and music teacher (1748–1823)

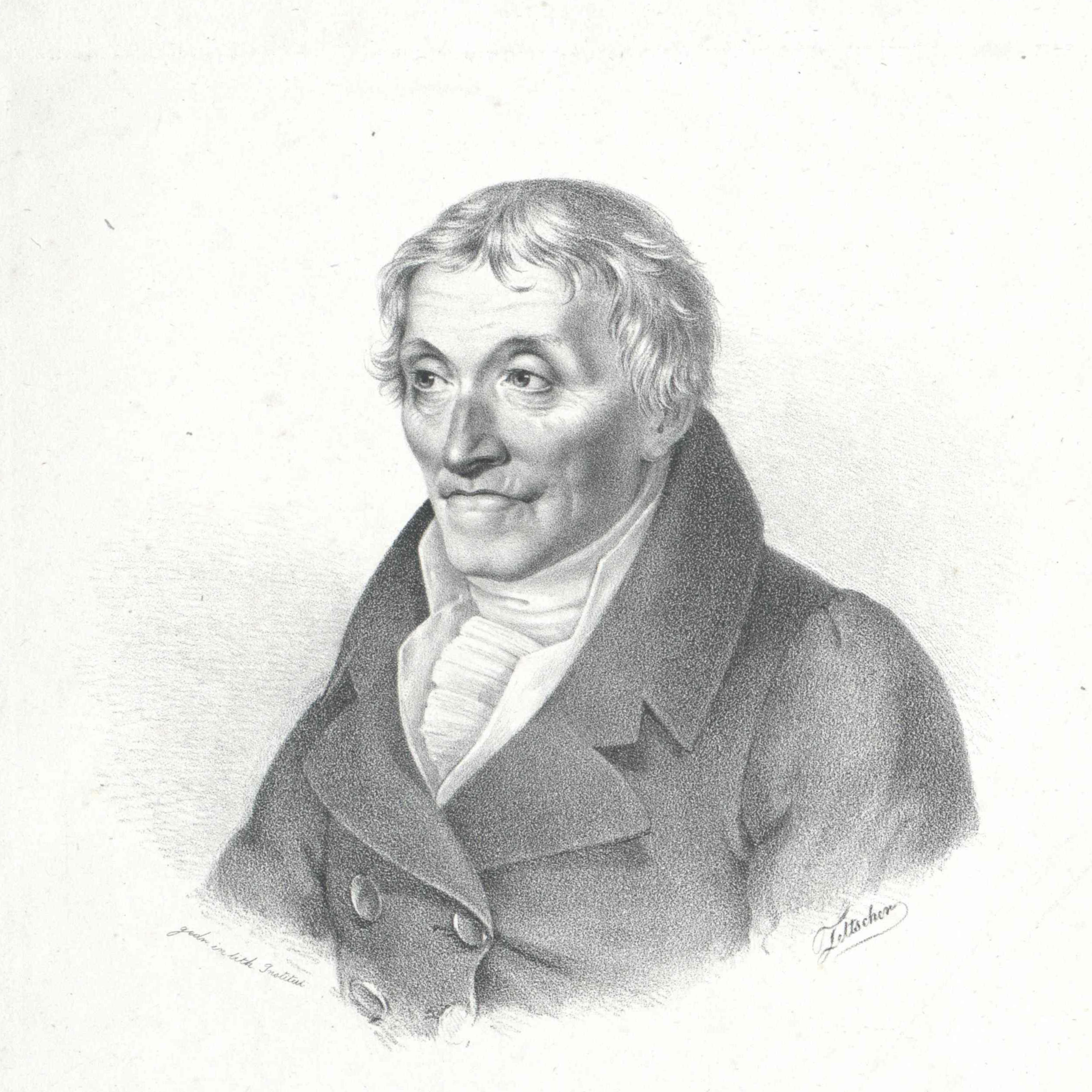
Emanuel Alois Förster

Emanuel Aloys Förster (26 January 1748 – 12 November 1823) was a composer and music teacher, who spent most of his life in Vienna, Austria.

== Early life ==
Emanuel Aloys Förster was born in Niedersteine bei Glatz, County of Glatz (Kingdom of Prussia).

Almost nothing is known of his family or parents except that his father was an administrator in an economics office. From his early youth, Emanuel composed several concertos and many sonatas purely from his correct musical ear. He acquired only later a copy of a theoretical work by Carl Philipp Emanuel Bach (probably Versuch über die wahre Art das Klavier zu spielen, "Essay on the true art of keyboard playing"), which he copied out. When he had left school he went to work for some years in his father's office, and then he was called up into the Prussian army and spent the last two years of the Seven Years' War as an oboist in the "Fouquet'schen Regiment". After that (around 1763) he went to Mittelwalde where he lived in the intimate circle of, and studied with, the (at that time) famous organist Johann Georg Pausewang. Probably through his agency, Förster went to Prague from 1776 to 1779, after which he settled in Vienna, where he worked as a composer and music teacher. Through his marriage to Eleonore von Reczka, he developed contacts to the Viennese aristocracy, which furthered his reputation.

In Vienna, he became friends with Mozart and Haydn—both of whom are said to have influenced Förster's musical style—while his students included Louis Niedermeyer and Franz Pecháček. Through Prince Karl Lichnowsky, he met Ludwig van Beethoven; the composer, 22 years his junior, appreciated his talents and recommended students to him, including Andreas Rasumofsky and Charles Neate. Förster's compositions were often played, along with those of Beethoven and Haydn, by the legendary Schuppanzigh Quartet.

In addition to his compositions, he wrote an "Introduction to the Figured Bass," a treatise for composition students.

Förster and Eleonore had five children. Their daughter Eleonore (b. 1799) became a renowned pianist who herself composed variations for piano, violin, viola and cello; she married a Count Conti in 1823. Her brother Joseph, a year younger, was also a pianist and cellist. Förster's daughter Michaelina married the violinist Pietro Rovelli (1793–1838).
