= Ścinawka Dolna =

- Village
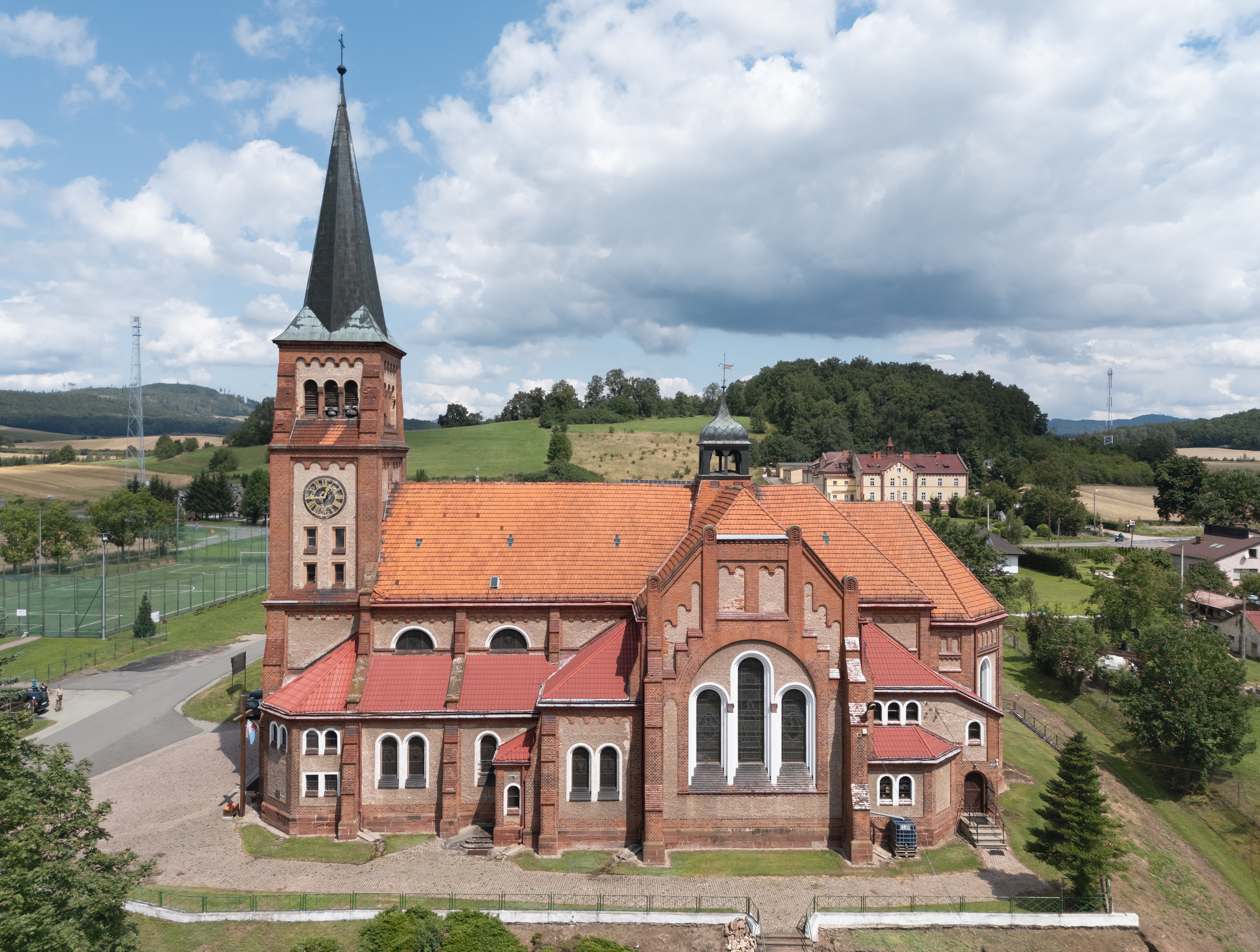

- Location within Poland
- Coordinates: 50°31′N 16°30′E
- Country: Poland
- Voivodeship: Lower Silesian
- County: Kłodzko
- Gmina: Radków

Population
  - Total: 1,261

Ścinawka Dolna [ɕt͡ɕiˈnafka ˈdɔlna] is a village in the administrative district of Gmina Radków, within Kłodzko County, Lower Silesian Voivodeship, in south-western Poland.

== People ==
- Emanuel Aloys Förster
