= Gajów =

- Village
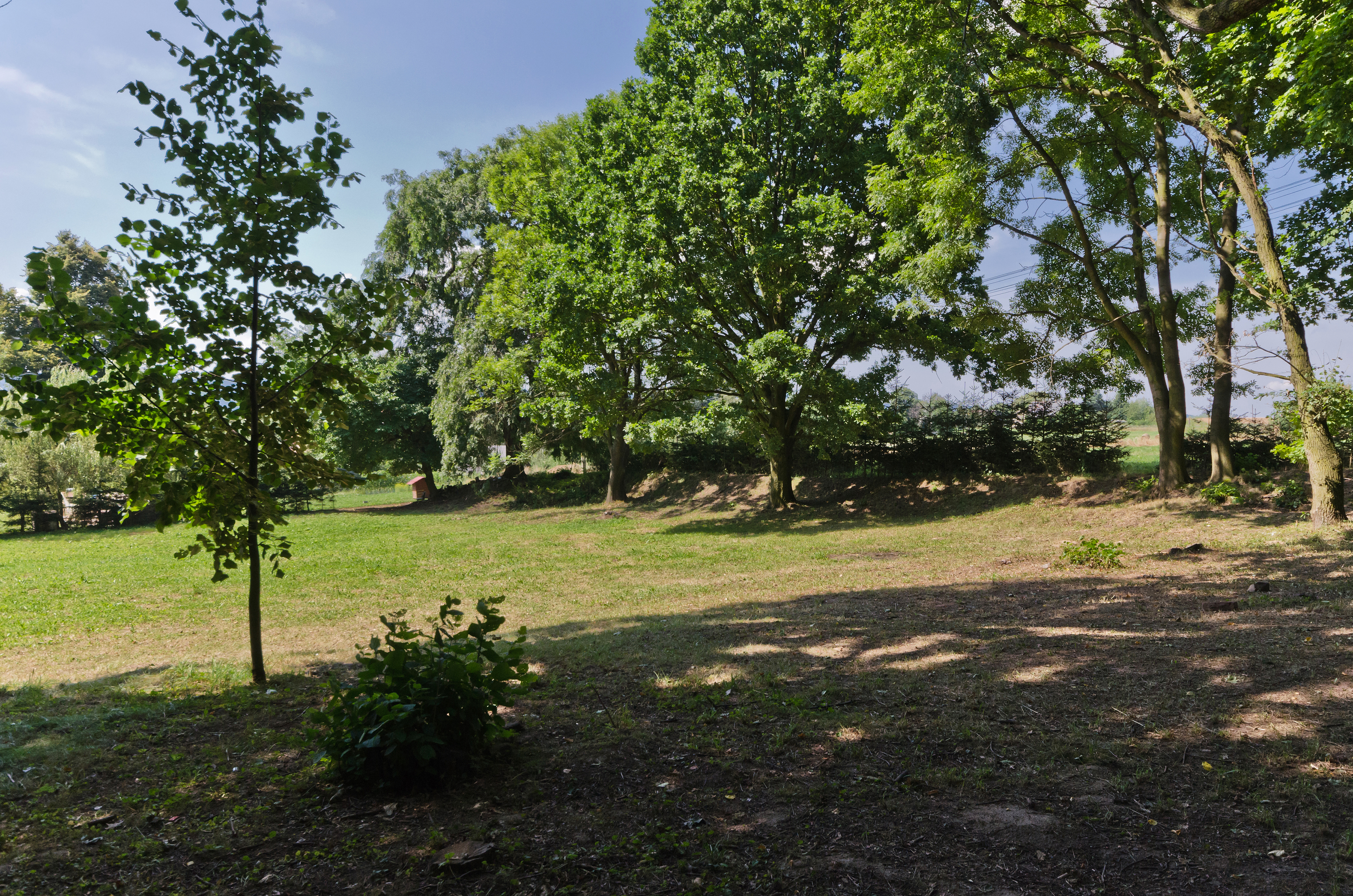
- Park

- Location within Poland
- Coordinates: 50°31′47″N 16°24′57″E
- Country: Poland
- Voivodeship: Lower Silesian
- County: Kłodzko
- Gmina: Radków
- Time zone: UTC+1 (CET)
  - Summer (DST): UTC+2 (CEST)
- Vehicle registration: DKL

Gajów [ˈɡajuf] is a village in the administrative district of Gmina Radków, within Kłodzko County, Lower Silesian Voivodeship, in south-western Poland.
