= Ratno Górne =

- Village
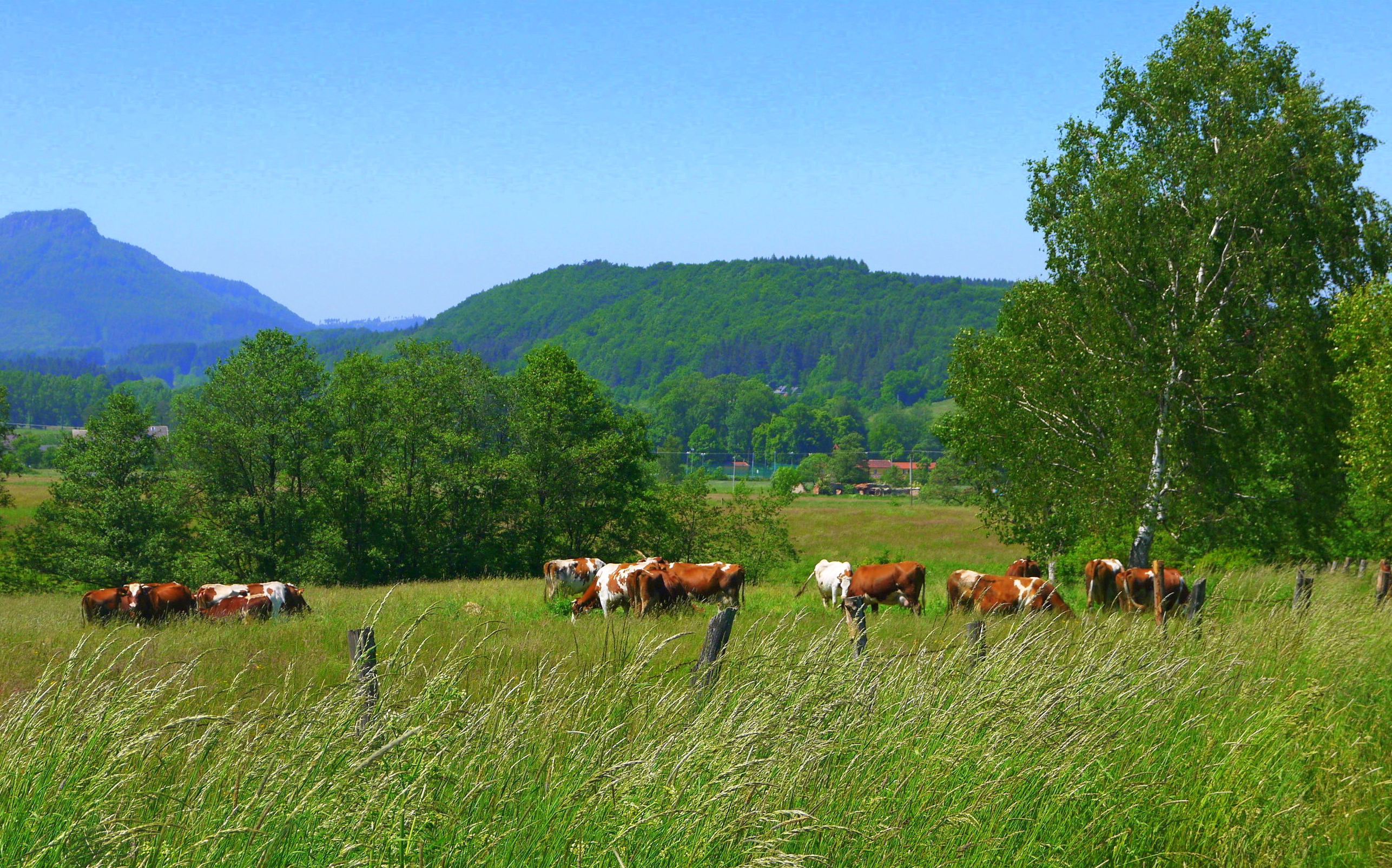

- Location within Poland
- Coordinates: 50°30′0″N 16°32′15″E
- Country: Poland
- Voivodeship: Lower Silesian
- County: Kłodzko
- Gmina: Radków

Ratno Górne [ˈratnɔ ˈɡurnɛ] is a village in the administrative district of Gmina Radków, within Kłodzko County, Lower Silesian Voivodeship, in south-western Poland.
