= Raszków, Lower Silesian Voivodeship =

Raszków
- Village
- Location within Poland
- Coordinates: 50°29′10″N 16°29′15″E
- Country: Poland
- Voivodeship: Lower Silesian
- County: Kłodzko
- Gmina: Radków

Raszków [ˈraʂkuf] is a village in the administrative district of Gmina Radków, within Kłodzko County, Lower Silesian Voivodeship, in south-western Poland.

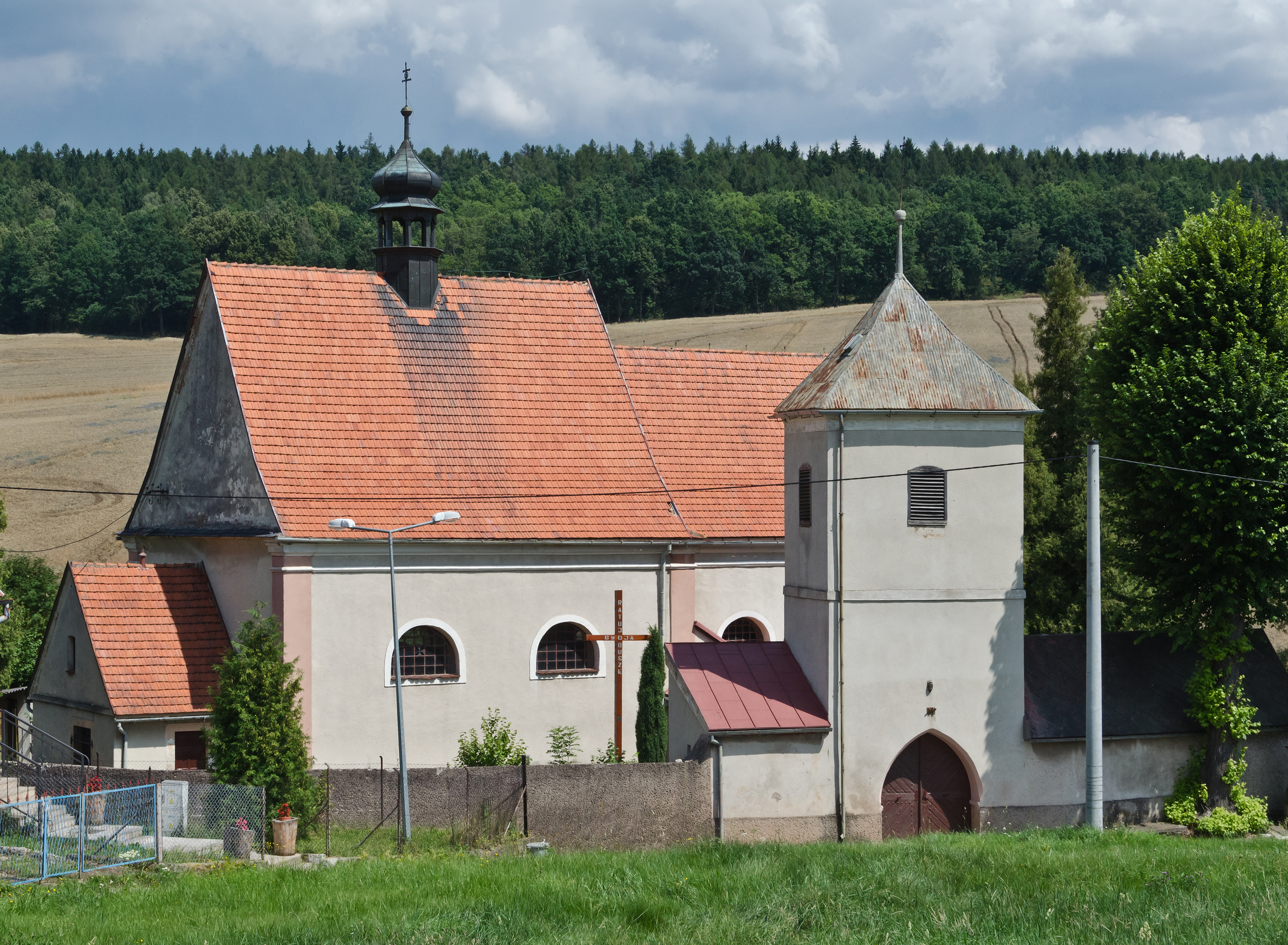
Saints Peter and Paul church

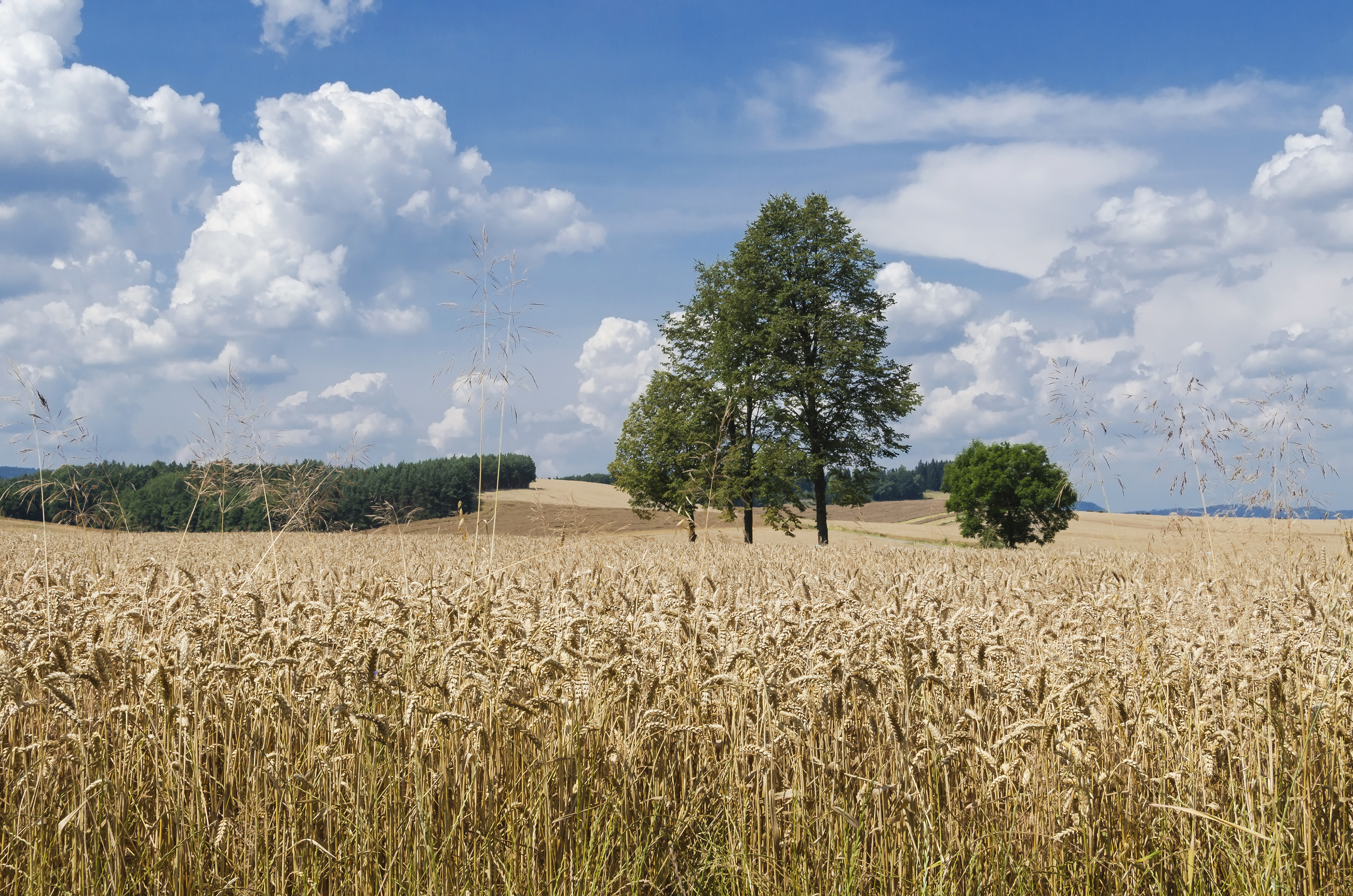
Field crops in Raszków
