= Šonov =

- Municipality
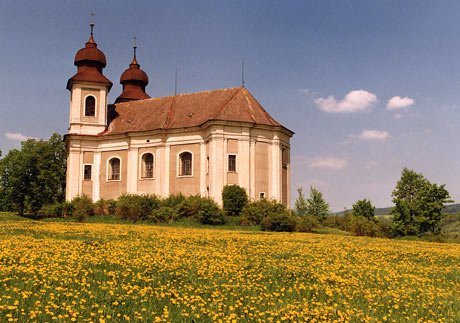
- Church of Saint Margaret

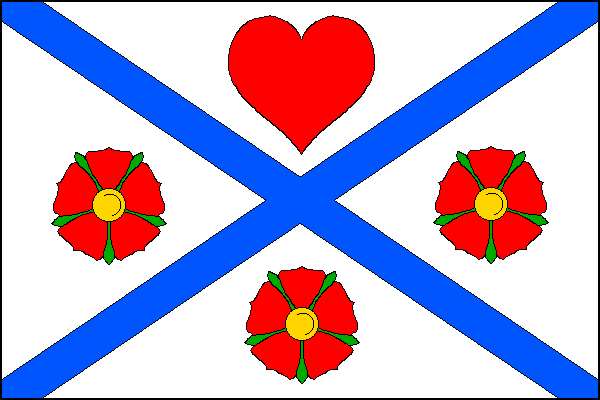
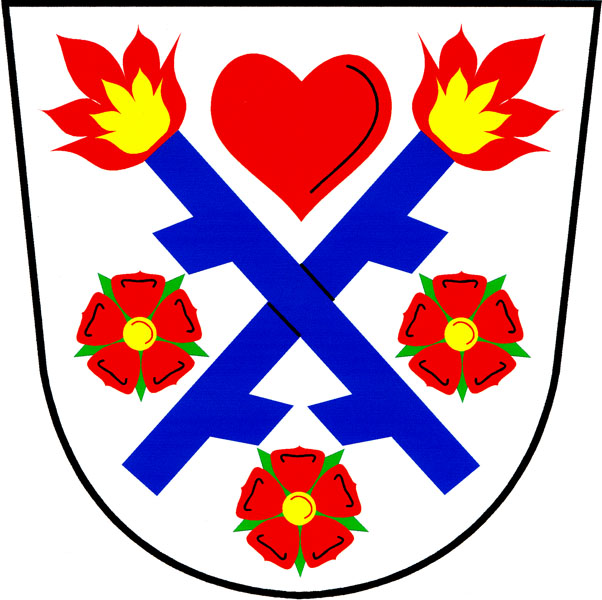
- Flag Coat of arms

- Location in the Czech Republic
- Coordinates: 50°35′27″N 16°24′6″E
- Country: Czech Republic
- Region: Hradec Králové
- District: Náchod
- First mentioned: 1300

Area
  - Total: 20.72 km^{2} (8.00 sq mi)
- Elevation: 460 m (1,510 ft)

Population (2026-01-01)
  - Total: 292
  - Density: 14.1/km^{2} (36.5/sq mi)
- Time zone: UTC+1 (CET)
  - Summer (DST): UTC+2 (CEST)
- Postal code: 549 71
- Website: www.sonov.cz

Šonov (German: Schönau) is a municipality and village in Náchod District in the Hradec Králové Region of the Czech Republic. It has about 300 inhabitants. It is known for the Church of Saint Margaret, protected as a national cultural monument.

== Etymology ==
The initial German name Schönau was derived from (in der) schönen Au, meaning '(on a) beautiful meadow'. The Czech name was created by transcription of the German name.

== Geography ==
Šonov is located about 25 kilometres (16 mi) northeast of Náchod and 21 km (13 mi) south of the Polish city of Wałbrzych, on the border with Poland. It lies in the Broumov Highlands and within the Broumovsko Protected Landscape Area. The highest point is the hill Červená hora at 747 m (2,451 ft) above sea level. The village is situated in the valley of the stream Šonovský potok.

== History ==
The village was founded by German colonists, probably between 1253 and 1258. The first written mention of Šonov is from 1300.

== Demographics ==
Historical population

Year	Pop.	±%
1869	1,959	—
1880	1,786	−8.8%
1890	1,556	−12.9%
1900	1,364	−12.3%
1910	1,258	−7.8%

Year	Pop.	±%
1921	1,150	−8.6%
1930	1,085	−5.7%
1950	494	−54.5%
1961	429	−13.2%
1970	355	−17.2%

Year	Pop.	±%
1980	305	−14.1%
1991	308	+1.0%
2001	322	+4.5%
2011	322	+0.0%
2021	284	−11.8%

Source: Censuses

== Transport ==
On the Czech–Polish border is the road border crossing Šonov / Tłumaczów.

== Sights ==
The main landmark of Šonov is the Church of Saint Margaret. It was built in the Baroque style in 1724–1726 according to the design by architect Kilian Ignaz Dientzenhofer. For its value it has been protected as a national cultural monument since 2022.
