= Ścinawka Górna =

Village in Lower Silesian Voivodeship, Poland

- Village
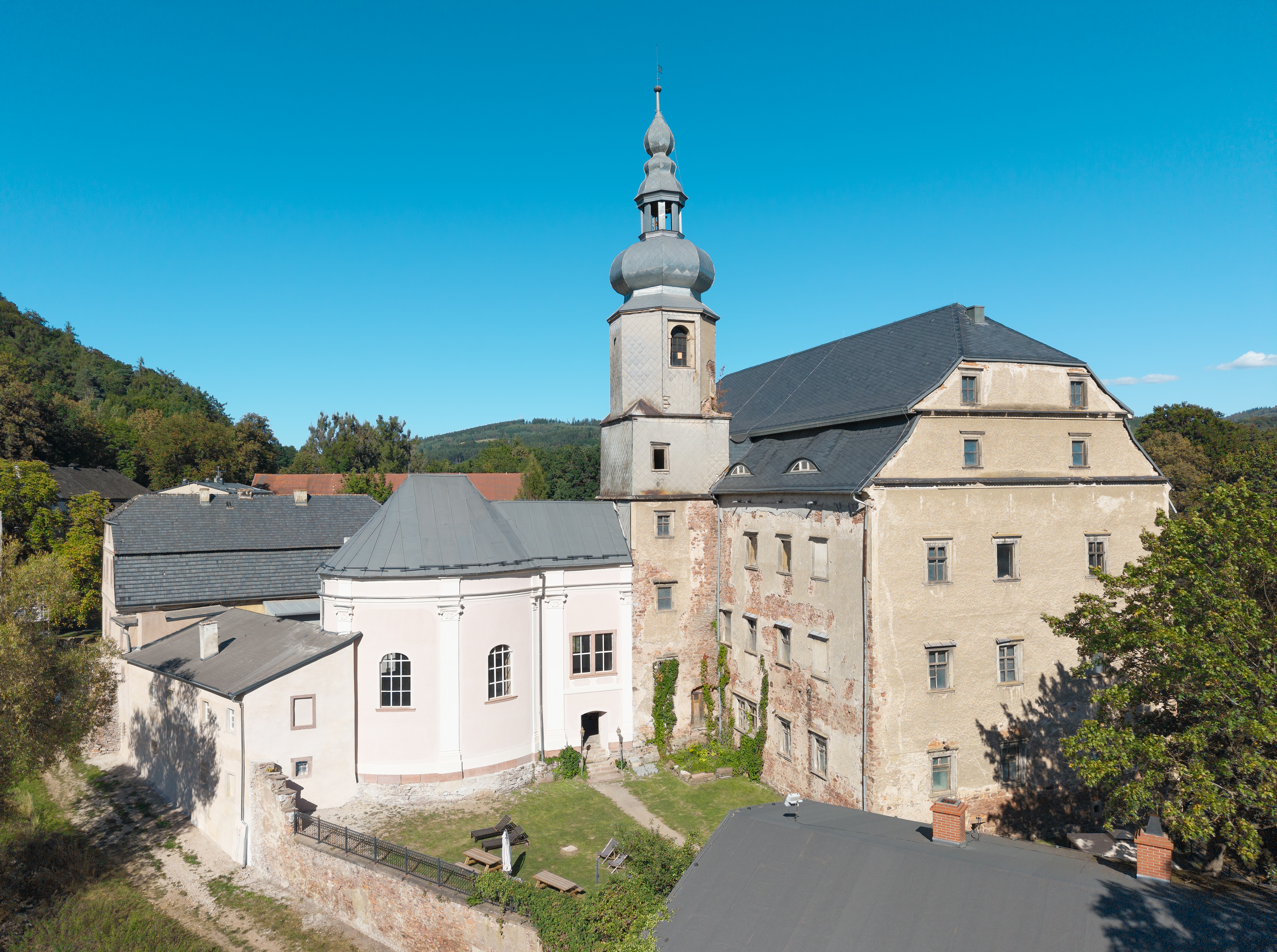

- Location within Poland
- Coordinates: 50°31′44″N 16°28′51″E
- Country: Poland
- Voivodeship: Lower Silesian
- County: Kłodzko
- Gmina: Radków

Ścinawka Górna [ɕt͡ɕiˈnafka ˈɡurna] is a village in the administrative district of Gmina Radków, within Kłodzko County, Lower Silesian Voivodeship, in south-western Poland.

== Attractions ==
The village includes the hamlet of Sarny with its 16th-century castle and 19th-century park. The castle, owned for centuries by Czech, Habsburg and then German noblemen, in 1866 was the birthplace of Gustav Adolf von Götzen, German Governor of German East Africa.
