= Paul Bartsch =

Silesian-American biologist (1871–1960)

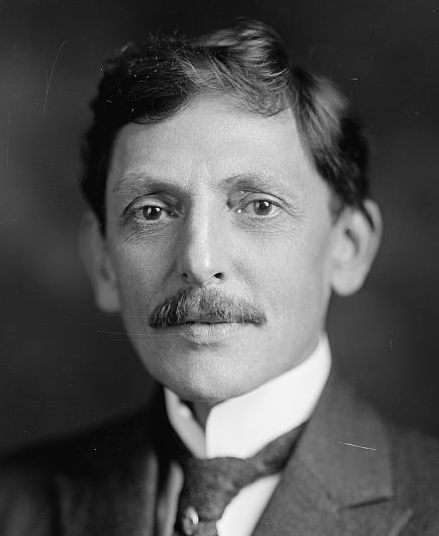
- Bartsch c. 1905–45
- Born: 14 August 1871; Tuntschendorf, Silesia, German Empire
- Died: 24 April 1960 (aged 88); McLean, Virginia
- Education: University of Iowa
- Known for: Invented one of the first underwater cameras
- Scientific career
- Fields: Malacology, carcinology
- Workplaces: George Washington University and National Museum of Natural History

Paul Bartsch (14 August 1871 Tuntschendorf, Silesia – 24 April 1960 McLean, Virginia) was an American malacologist and carcinologist. He was named the last of those belonging to the "Descriptive Age of Malacology".

== Early life ==
Bartsch emigrated with his parents to the United States in 1880, first to Missouri and then to Burlington, Iowa. As a child, he took up jobs in his spare time in several employments. He soon took an interest in nature, first by keeping a small menagerie at home, and during his high school years, collecting birds and preparing skins. He established a natural-history club in his home with a little museum and a workshop. By the time he went to the University of Iowa in 1893, he had collected 2,000 skins.

Among Bartsch′s professors at the university were the geologist Samuel Calvin, the botanists Thomas H. Macbride and Bohumil Shimek, and the zoologist Charles C. Nutting. He graduated from the university with a Bachelor of Science degree in 1896, a Master of Science degree in 1899, and a PhD in 1905.

== Career ==
In 1896 Bartsch was invited by William H. Dall to the Smithsonian Institution in Washington, D.C., to serve as his assistant in the Division of Mollusks. At that time, Bartsch knew little about mollusks and expected more to make ornithology his life work.

In 1899 Bartsch became an instructor in zoology at the Columbian University (later The George Washington University), but declined the next year a full-time professorship as he was more devoted to scientific research. Nevertheless, he was later given the title of professor, as he continued to teach in the evening and in the weekends. He was joined a few years later by Dall in directing graduate students. Bartsch continued teaching zoology until he retired in 1945 with the rank of professor emeritus.

In 1901 Bartsch became lecturer on histology at the Medical School of Howard University. His workload became heavier as in 1902 he was promoted to professor of histology and became director of the histology laboratory. Also in 1902, he started systematic scientific bird banding, the first to do so in modern times. In 1903 he became director of the physiology laboratory and lecturer in medical zoology. he continued in this capacity for 37 years.

In 1914 Bartsch became curator at the National Museum of Natural History of the combined divisions of Mollusks and Marine Invertebrates. As his workload became too heavy, the two divisions, which had been separate before he became curator, were separated again in 1920. Bartsch continued as curator of the mollusk division until 1945.

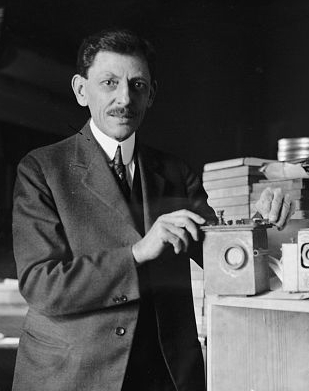
Bartsch with an underwater camera in 1926

In 1922, Bartsch invented an underwater camera.

In 1956 Bartsch retired from the Smithsonian Institution after more than 50 years of service. He retreated into his estate on the Potomac River shore at Mason's Neck, below Fort Belvoir, Virginia. He spent his time in turning the estate into a wildlife sanctuary.

Bartsch′s papers are held at the George Washington University.

== Scientific contributions ==
At first Bartsch′s works as an assistant of W. H. Dall consisted in cataloguing, together with Charles T. Simpson, the exhibit collection of the Smithsonian Institution. He published his first malacological paper, as a junior author together with Dall, in September 1901: A New Californian Bittium. Nautilus, 15 (5): 58–59. His first malacological publication as sole author was in May 1902: A New Rissoina from California. Nautilus, 16 (1). In 1903 he started the study of the Pyramidellidae, a family of mostly small and minute ectoparasitic sea snails. In 1905 he was awarded the degree of Doctor of Philosophy at the University of Iowa, with a dissertation based on the Pyramidellidae of the west coast of the United States. Also in 1905 he became assistant curator at the Smithsonian Institution.

Between 1903 and 1907 he published twelve papers on land and freshwater shells, showing his interest in Philippine land snails and in the family Urocoptidae in America.

On 9 October 1907, Bartsch left from San Francisco, California, aboard the United States Bureau of Fisheries steamer USFS Albatros to take part in a cruise in the waters of the Philippine Islands and the China Seas on an expedition to collect specimens of marine and non-marine snails. Over 87,000 specimens were cataloged, many of which still have to be studied. Bartsch left the expedition at Hong Kong after ten months and traveled home via Europe, arriving in Washington, D.C., in October 1908. In 1909 he published, with Dall as co-author, his monograph on the West American Pyramidellidae. This was followed by twelve papers on the same subject between 1910 and 1912.

In 1915 Bartsch published, after five years of preparation, his study of South African marine mollusks, initiated by the donation by William H. Turton of his collection in 1906.

In February and April 1909 Bartsch was aboard Albatross for a voyage along the Pacific coast of North America from San Diego, California, to the Baja California peninsula. This resulted in another collection of mollusks and other invertebrates.

In May 1912 Bartsch was invited on an expedition to the Bahamas aboard the Carnegie Institution of Washington motor vessel Anton Dohrn. He became intrigued by the variety of the halophilic land snail genus Cerion. His study and later experiments resulted in 1920 in the publication of the paper Experiments in the Breeding of Cerions, Papers from the Department of Marine Biology, Carnegie Institution of Washington, 14 (282).

Another expedition occurred in May and June 1914 aboard the schooner Thomas Barrera in the waters of Cuba. This made a lasting impression on Bartsch and led to his later expeditions to the Greater and Lesser Antilles, resulting in several publications on West Indian land snails.

In 1916, at the request of the United States Navy, Bartsch started a study of shipworms. He suggested several novel procedures against these boring clams in his paper Report on the Marine Boring Mollusks in Guantanamo Bay, Cuba. Public Works of the Navy under the Cognizance of the Bureau of Yards and Docks and the Corps of Civil Engineers, U.S. Navy. Navy Department Bureau of Yards and Docks Bulletin, 28:48-50. This was followed in the coming years by many other studies on the same subject.

In the following years he continued his travels to the Florida Keys, the Bahamas, Cuba. and the West Indies. During these expeditions more than a half million mollusks were collected, as well as many marine invertebrates, fish, birds, and reptiles.

In 1927 Bartsch started his study of the large gastropod family Turridae. Between 1934 and 1950 he wrote eight papers on various genera in this family.

Between 1923 and 1939 Bartsch published several papers on intermediate snail hosts of the Asiatic blood fluke Schistosoma japonicum.

In October 1932 Eldridge R. Johnson equipped and offered for use his yacht Caroline to the Smithsonian Institution in what was to be known as the Johnson-Smithsonian Deep-Sea Expedition to the Puerto Rico Trench. The Smithsonian chose Bartsch to direct the expedition. Caroline sailed from New York City on 21 January 1933 and returned to the Washington Navy Yard in Washington, D.C., on 14 March 1933. The expedition included investigators from several disciplines and government agencies and institutions interested in oceanographic work. Those included the Naval Research Laboratory, the United States Department of Agriculture, and the United States Department of Commerce, as well as The American Museum of Natural History, the Carnegie Institution, and the Oceanographic Institution of Woods Hole. In addition to the scientific party, Johnson and his son, E. R. Fenimore Johnson, who had helped prepare the yacht, and invited guest went with the expedition. Aside from the description and addition to collections of new species, three lines of echo soundings were gathered across the trench with the U.S. Navy echo sounding device operated by Thomas Townsend Brown and water samples were taken at various depths.

Between 1937 and 1941 Bartsch studied, jointly with the Cuban malacologist Don Carlos de la Torre, the Cuban land snail fauna. This resulted in a number of papers on the families Annulariidae, Helicinidae, and Urocoptidae.

== Species named by Bartsch ==
Paul Bartsch proposed 3278 taxa, 2,979 of which are of new species and subspecies, and 299 are supraspecific names. Of these 1257 were published together with another author. These taxa, except three, were all mollusks.

See also Category:Taxa named by Paul Bartsch

== Taxa named in honor of Bartsch ==
The species Bartsch's squid (Uroteuthis bartschi ) was named in his honor by Harald A. Rehder.

The World Register of Marine Species lists 61 taxa with the epithet bartschi, many of which have become synonyms.

A species (Anolis bartschi) and a subspecies (Cyclura carinata bartschi) of Caribbean lizards were named in Bartsch′s honor.

The Mariana swiftlet (Aerodramus bartschi) was named in honor of Bartsch by Edgar Alexander Mearns in 1909.
