= Sarny Palace =

Coordinates: 50.5463°N 16.4625°E

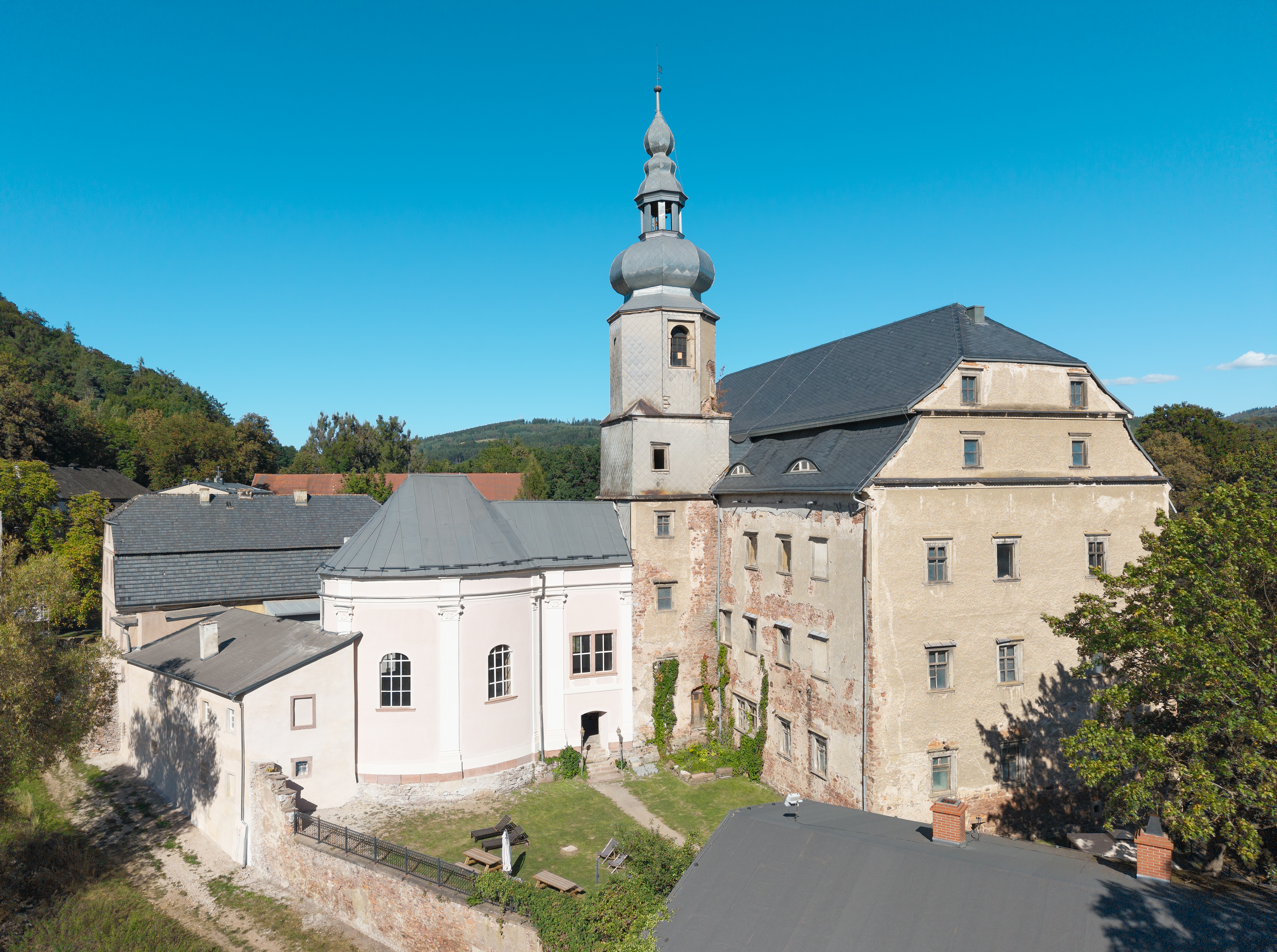
Sarny Palace

Sarny Castle (German: Schloss Scharfeneck) is a 16th-century palace compound in Sarny, Ścinawka Górna, the administrative district of Gmina Radków, within Kłodzko County, Lower Silesian Voivodeship, in south-western Poland.

== History ==
The palace is one of the largest historic residences of Lower Silesia, with the main building dating back to 1590. It was expanded several times, most notably in the 18th century when a chapel dedicated to John of Nepomuk was added to the main building, featuring an extensive polychrome decoration. A summer palace was also redeveloped in the 18th century. The compound features a total of 15 buildings.

A park was created in the 18th century, redeveloped in the late 19th century by Prussian landscape gardener Eduard Petzold.

Originally built for the Reichenbach family, the palace was a property of the Counts von Götzen between the 17th and the 19th century. Sold in the late 19th century to a wealthy merchant, the palace gradually began falling into disrepair. The last German owner was heiress Lilly Poppler and her husband Prof. Franz Poppler.

After World War II because of the decisions made during the Yalta Conference, the Kłodzko Land was transferred from Germany to Poland and Scharfeneck was renamed Sarny. The palace compound was first occupied by the Red Army to later be nationalized in communist Poland and turned into a collective farm. After communism collapsed in 1989, the property remained in the state's hands, largely abandoned and falling into deeper ruin.

In late 2013, it was sold to private individuals who established a charitable trust running Sarny Castle. In the first year of operation, a collapsed roof over a 17th-century granary was replaced with a new structure. Structural reconstruction was done on the castle in 2016-2020.

In May 2017, a visitor center and cafe opened in the castle's gatehouse after more than three years of refurbishment, also making the chapel available to tourists on a daily basis. In 2020, a hotel opened in two farm buildings.

== Notable residents ==
- Gustav Adolf von Götzen (1866 – 1910), German explorer and Governor of German East Africa

== Notable visitors ==
- Donald Tusk (2023), Poland's prime minister and former president of the European Council
- Olga Tokarczuk, Polish writer awarded the 2018 Nobel Prize in Literature
- Agnieszka Holland (2021), Polish film and television director
- Svetlana Alexievich (2021), Belarusian essayist awarded the 2015 Nobel Prize in Literature
- Kasia Nosowska (2020), Polish rock singer
- Kazik Staszewski (2023), Polish rock singer
- Renata Przemyk (2023), Polish singer
- Hania Rani (2022), Polish pianist and composer
- Maciej Stuhr (2023), Polish actor
- Marian Turski (2023), Polish historian and journalist
