= Tłumaczów =

- Village
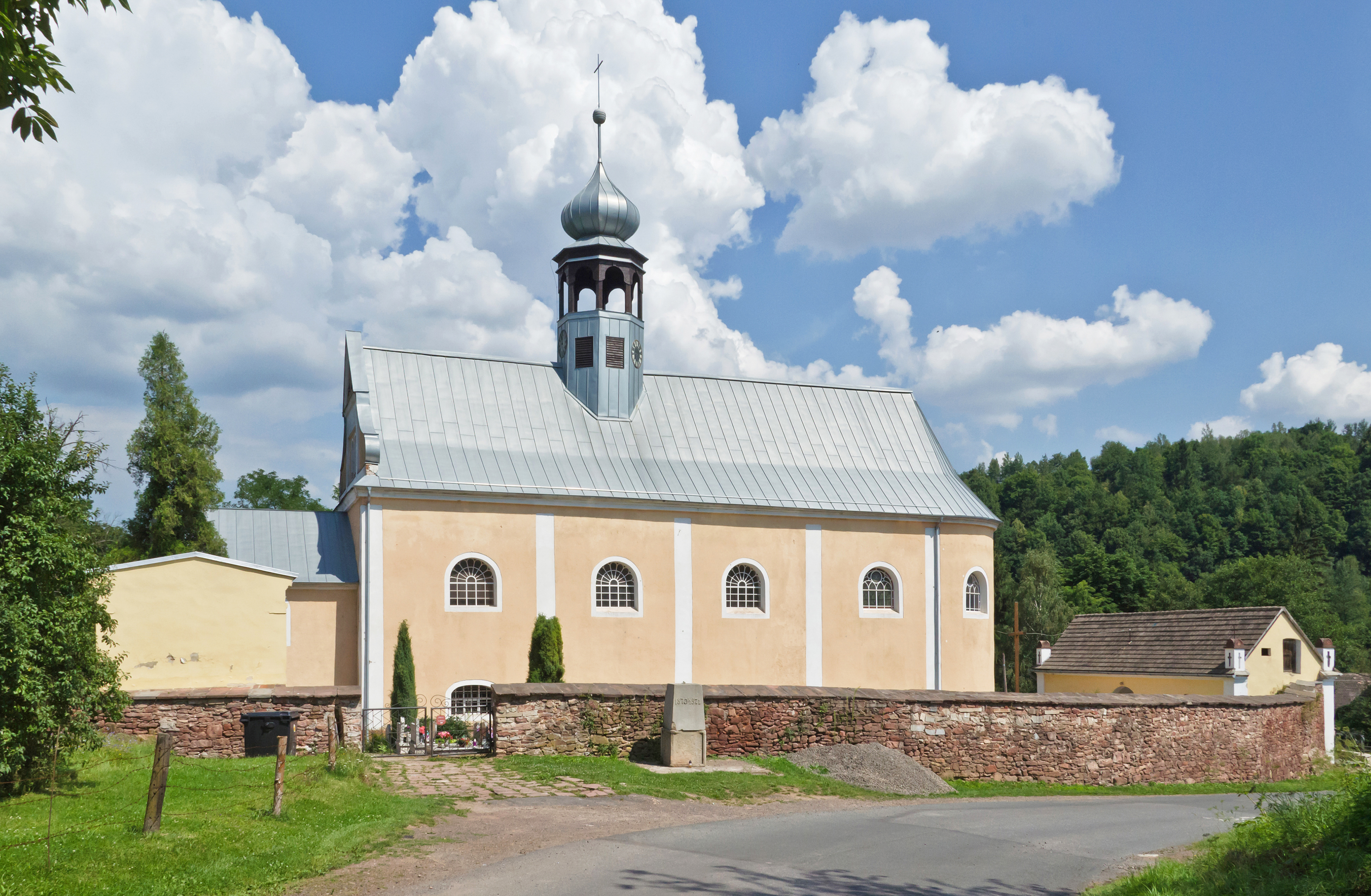
- Saints Peter and Paul Church

- Location within Poland
- Coordinates: 50°33′N 16°25′E
- Country: Poland
- Voivodeship: Lower Silesian
- County: Kłodzko
- Gmina: Radków
- Time zone: UTC+1 (CET)
  - Summer (DST): UTC+2 (CEST)
- Vehicle registration: DKL

Tłumaczów [twuˈmat͡ʂuf] is a village in the administrative district of Gmina Radków, within Kłodzko County, Lower Silesian Voivodeship, in south-western Poland, on the border with the Czech Republic.

During World War I, the Germans operated a forced labour camp for Allied prisoners of war at a local faience factory.

== Notable people ==
- Paul Bartsch (1871–1960), German-American malacologist
