= Suchý Důl =

- Municipality
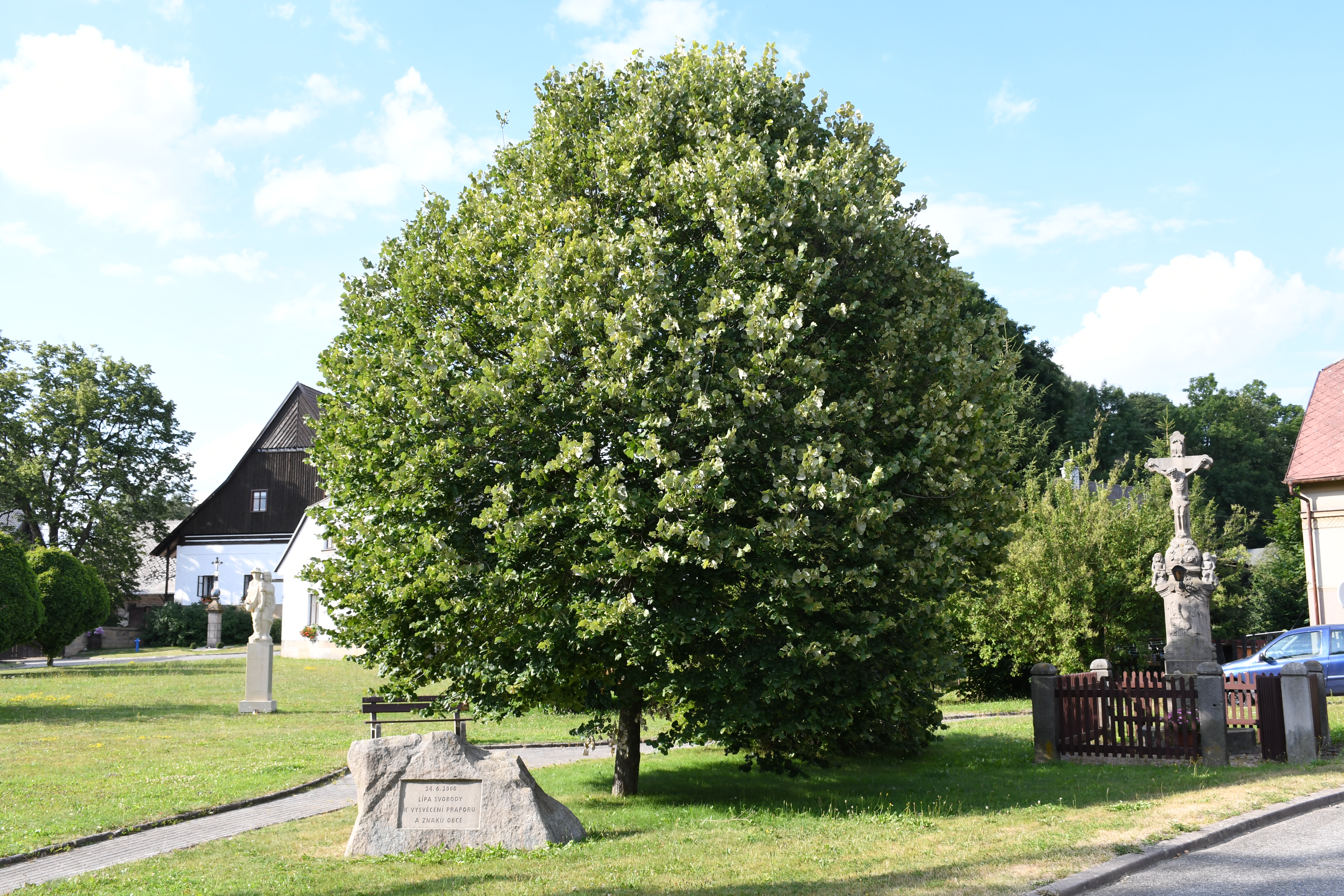
- Lime tree in the centre of Suchý Důl

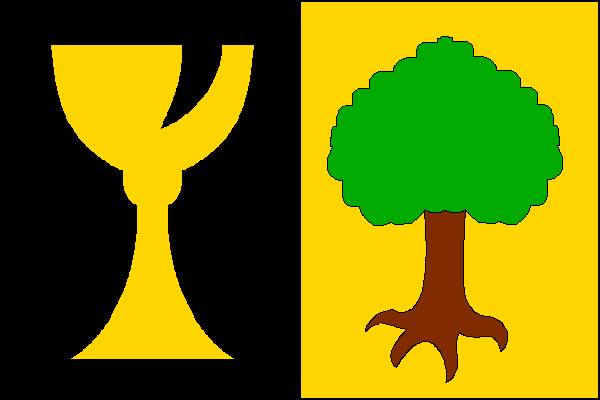
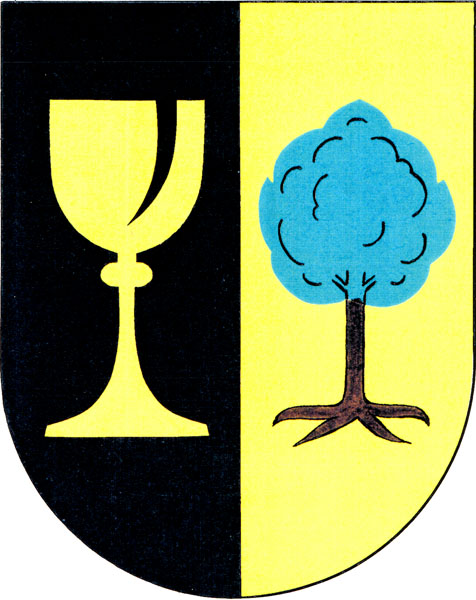
- Flag Coat of arms

- Location in the Czech Republic
- Coordinates: 50°32′24″N 16°15′56″E
- Country: Czech Republic
- Region: Hradec Králové
- District: Náchod
- First mentioned: 1395

Area
  - Total: 13.28 km^{2} (5.13 sq mi)
- Elevation: 489 m (1,604 ft)

Population (2026-01-01)
  - Total: 406
  - Density: 30.6/km^{2} (79.2/sq mi)
- Time zone: UTC+1 (CET)
  - Summer (DST): UTC+2 (CEST)
- Postal codes: 549 54, 549 62
- Website: www.suchydul.cz

Suchý Důl (German: Dörrengrund) is a municipality and village in Náchod District in the Hradec Králové Region of the Czech Republic. It has about 400 inhabitants.

== Administrative division ==
Suchý Důl consists of two municipal parts (in brackets population according to the 2021 census):

- Suchý Důl (329)
- Slavný (50)

== Demographics ==
Historical population
Year	Pop.	±%
1869	1,100	—
1880	1,124	+2.2%
1890	1,020	−9.3%
1900	1,001	−1.9%
1910	967	−3.4%
1921	835	−13.7%
1930	754	−9.7%
1950	513	−32.0%
1961	511	−0.4%
1970	441	−13.7%
1980	415	−5.9%
1991	339	−18.3%
2001	402	+18.6%
2011	429	+6.7%
2021	379	−11.7%
Source: Censuses
