= Velké Petrovice =

- Municipality
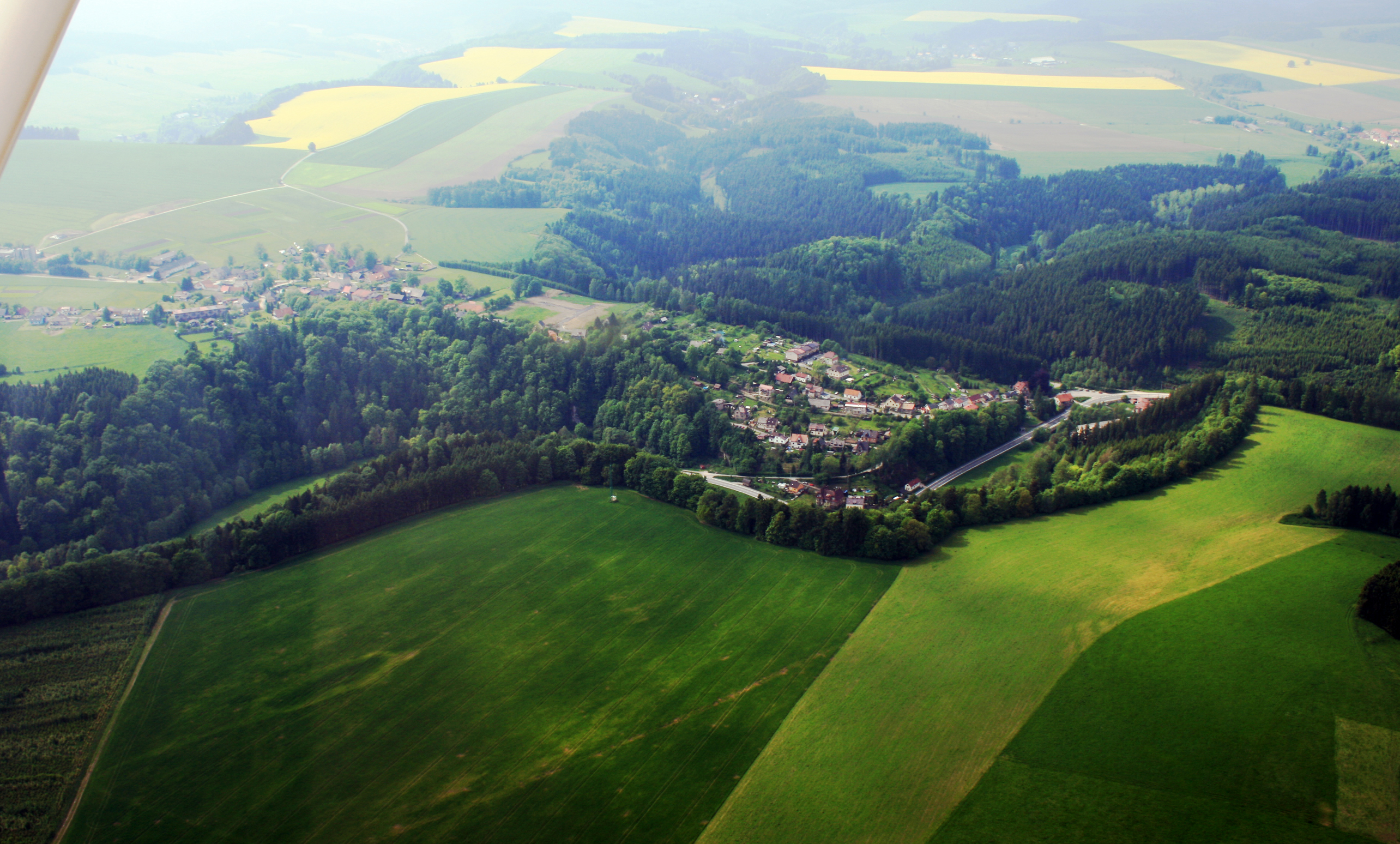
- Aerial view of Petrovice

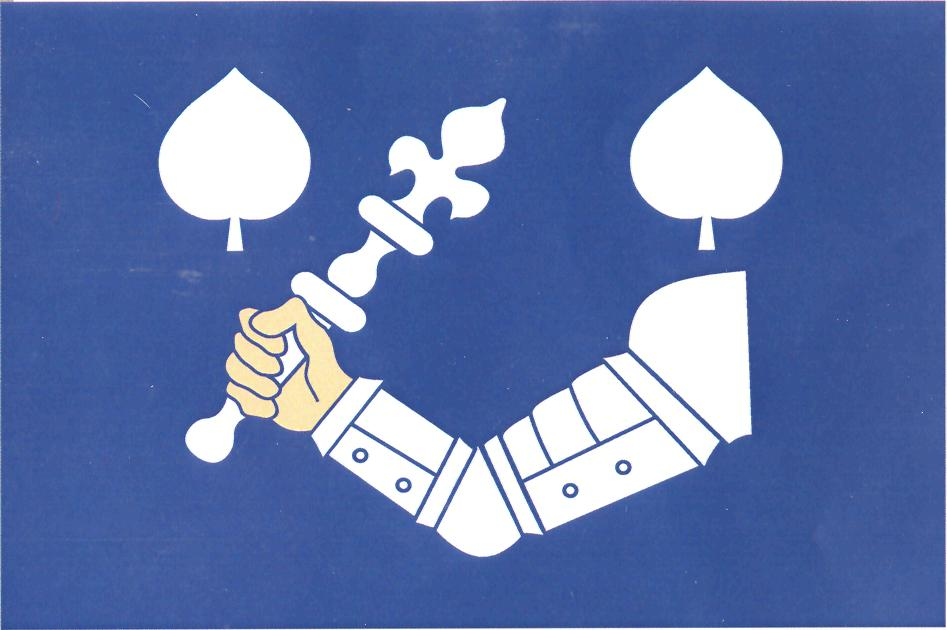
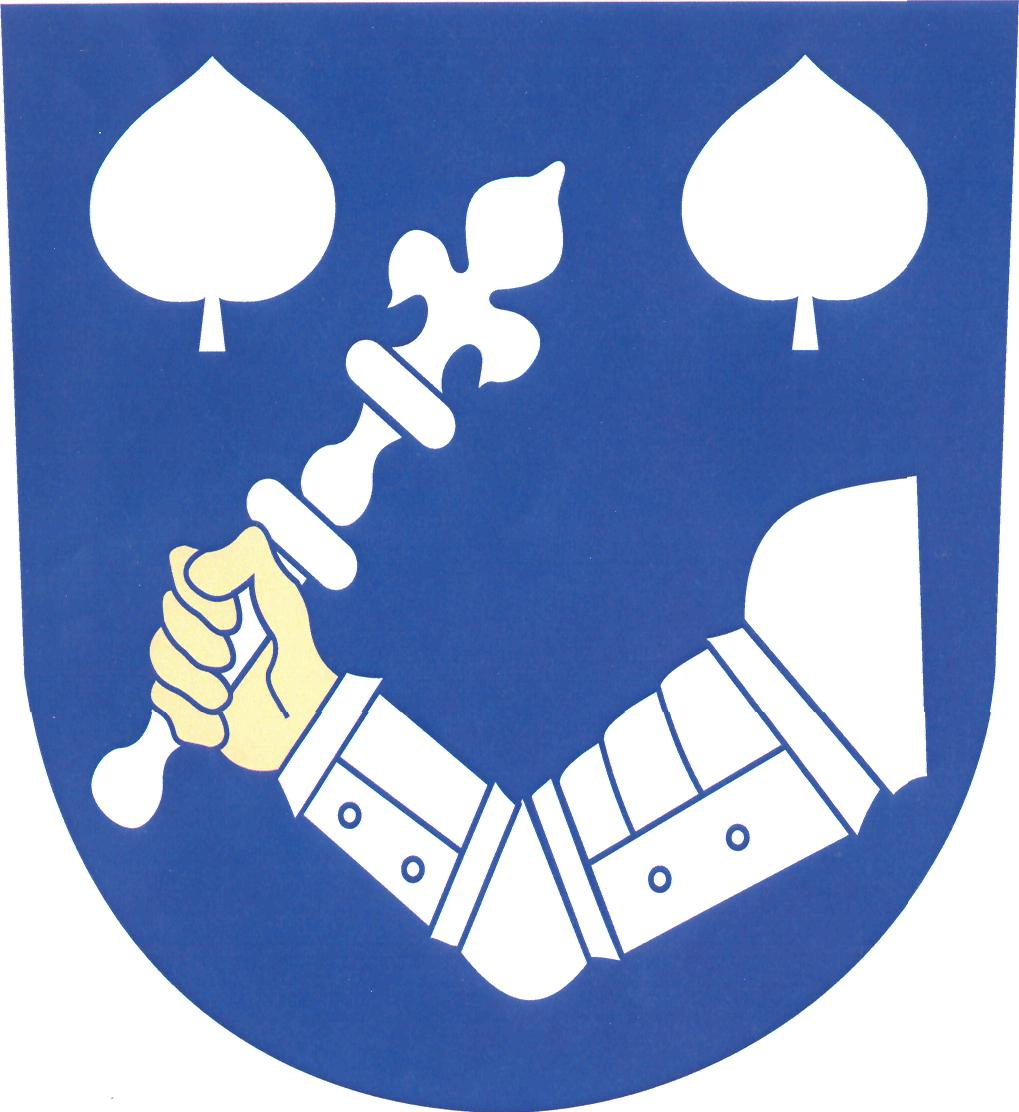
- Flag Coat of arms

- Location in the Czech Republic
- Coordinates: 50°31′2″N 16°12′23″E
- Country: Czech Republic
- Region: Hradec Králové
- District: Náchod
- First mentioned: 1255

Area
  - Total: 6.10 km^{2} (2.36 sq mi)
- Elevation: 486 m (1,594 ft)

Population (2026-01-01)
  - Total: 435
  - Density: 71.3/km^{2} (185/sq mi)
- Time zone: UTC+1 (CET)
  - Summer (DST): UTC+2 (CEST)
- Postal codes: 549 31, 549 54
- Website: www.velkepetrovice.cz

Velké Petrovice (German: Groß Petrowitz) is a municipality in Náchod District in the Hradec Králové Region of the Czech Republic. It has about 400 inhabitants.

== Administrative division ==
Velké Petrovice consists of three municipal parts (in brackets population according to the 2021 census):

- Petrovice (321)
- Petrovičky (50)
- Maršov nad Metují (24)

== Demographics ==
Historical population
Year	Pop.	±%
1869	839	—
1880	833	−0.7%
1890	845	+1.4%
1900	875	+3.6%
1910	849	−3.0%
1921	727	−14.4%
1930	766	+5.4%
1950	573	−25.2%
1961	525	−8.4%
1970	446	−15.0%
1980	399	−10.5%
1991	362	−9.3%
2001	370	+2.2%
2011	361	−2.4%
2021	395	+9.4%
Source: Censuses
