= Burg Scharfeneck =

Castle in Austria

Coordinates: 47.9511°N 16.6056°E

- Lower Austria, Austria
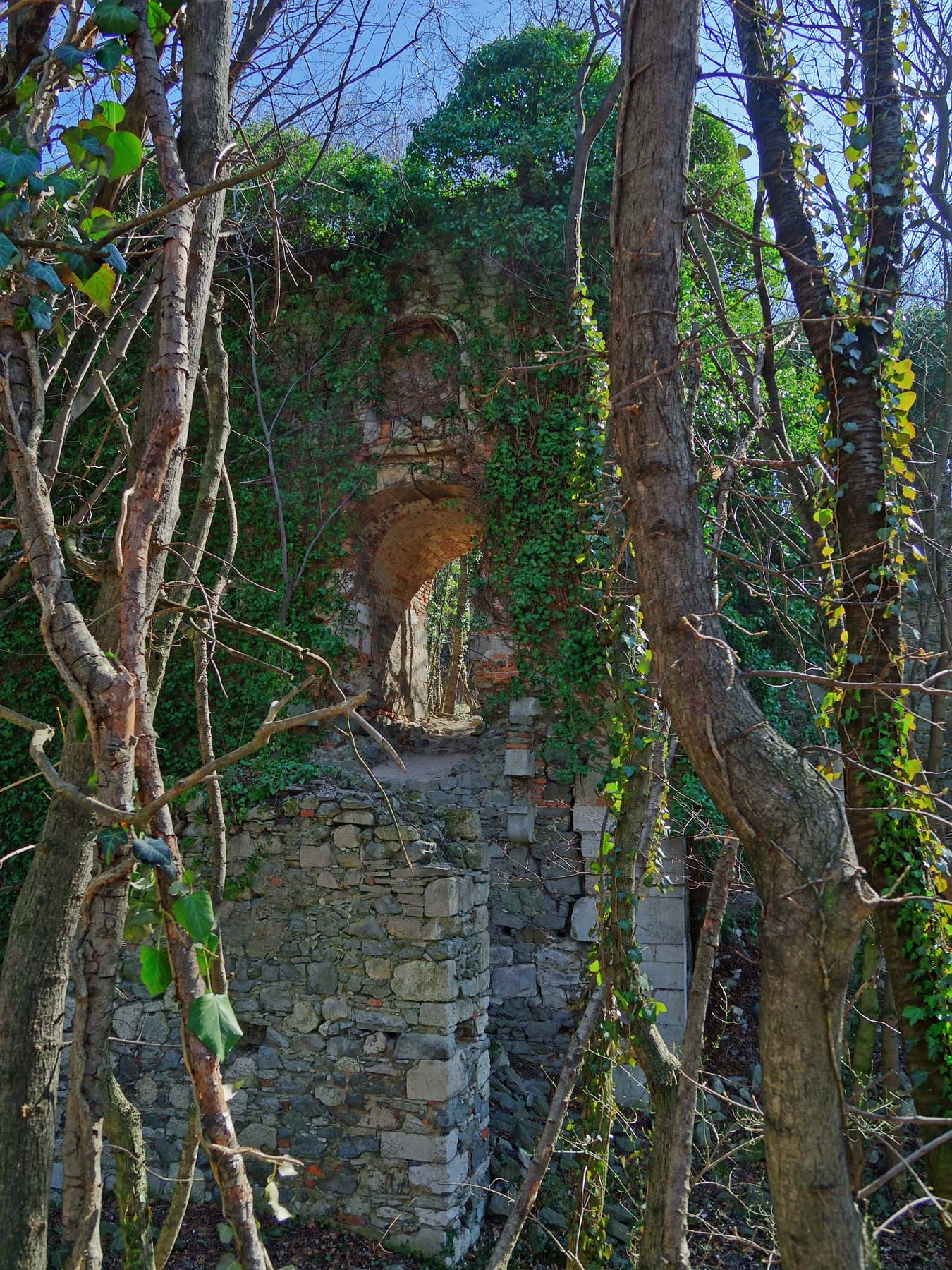
- Ruins of Burg Scharfeneck in 2012

Site information
- Type: Castle

Burg Scharfeneck is a ruinous moated medieval castle near Mannersdorf am Leithagebirge, Lower Austria, Austria. Likely rebuilt after 1400, the keep was destroyed by lightning during a spring thunderstorm in 1555 and was never rebuilt. The castle's walls are rectangular in shape, with a deep moat running along its northern and eastern sides. There are four corner bastions, one on each corner of the rectangular walls, and the stone walls themselves are up to 4.5 metres thick. The keep was originally 24 metres high.

== See also ==
- List of castles in Austria
