= Pasterka, Lower Silesian Voivodeship =

Pasterka
- Village
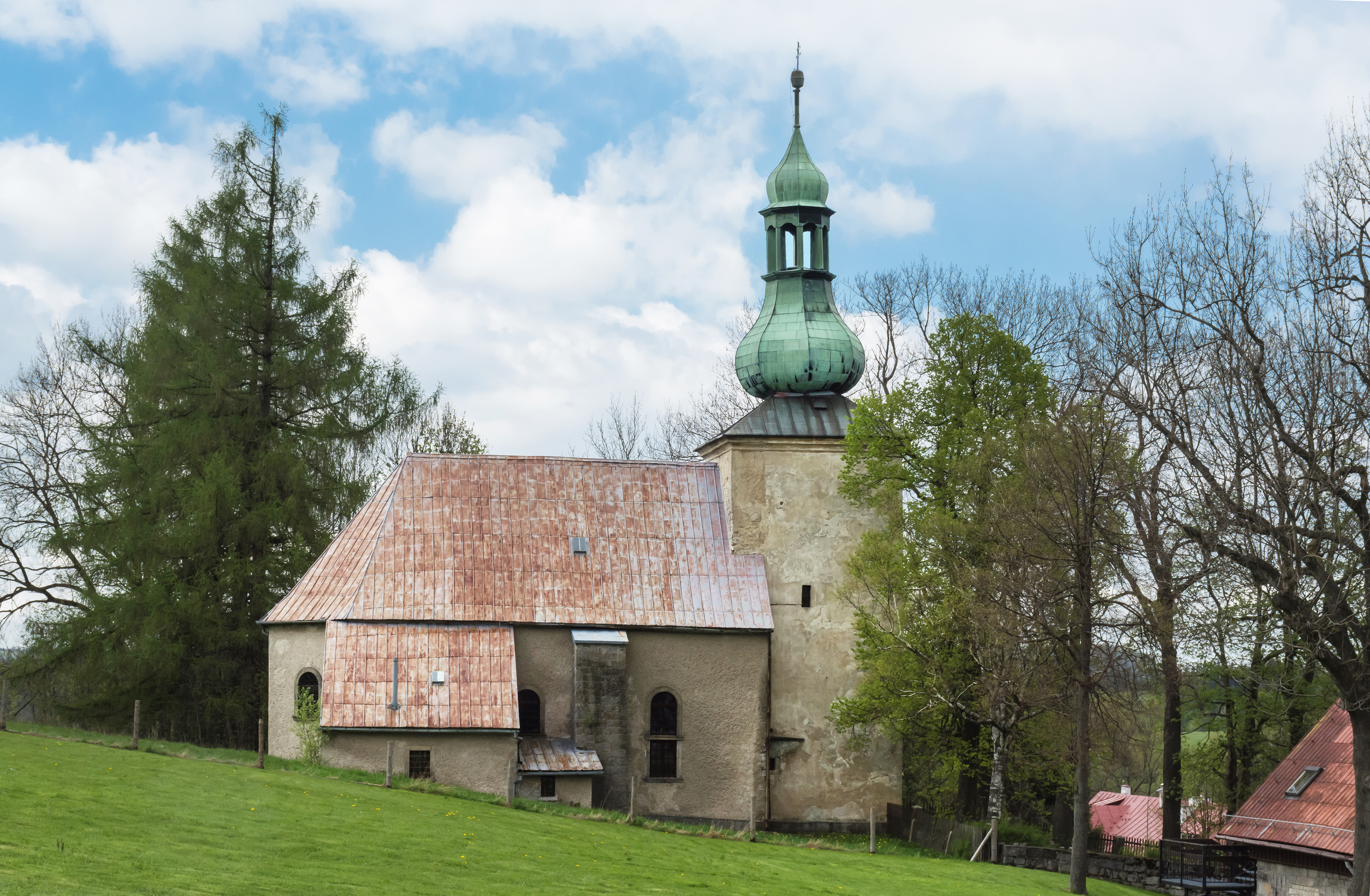

- Location within Poland
- Coordinates: 50°29′36″N 16°19′34″E
- Country: Poland
- Voivodeship: Lower Silesian
- County: Kłodzko
- Gmina: Radków

Population (approx.)
  - Total: 50

Pasterka [pasˈtɛrka] is a village in the administrative district of Gmina Radków, within Kłodzko County, Lower Silesian Voivodeship, in south-western Poland.
