= Gustav Adolf von Götzen =

German explorer, colonial administrator and military officer

Graf Gustav Adolf von Götzen
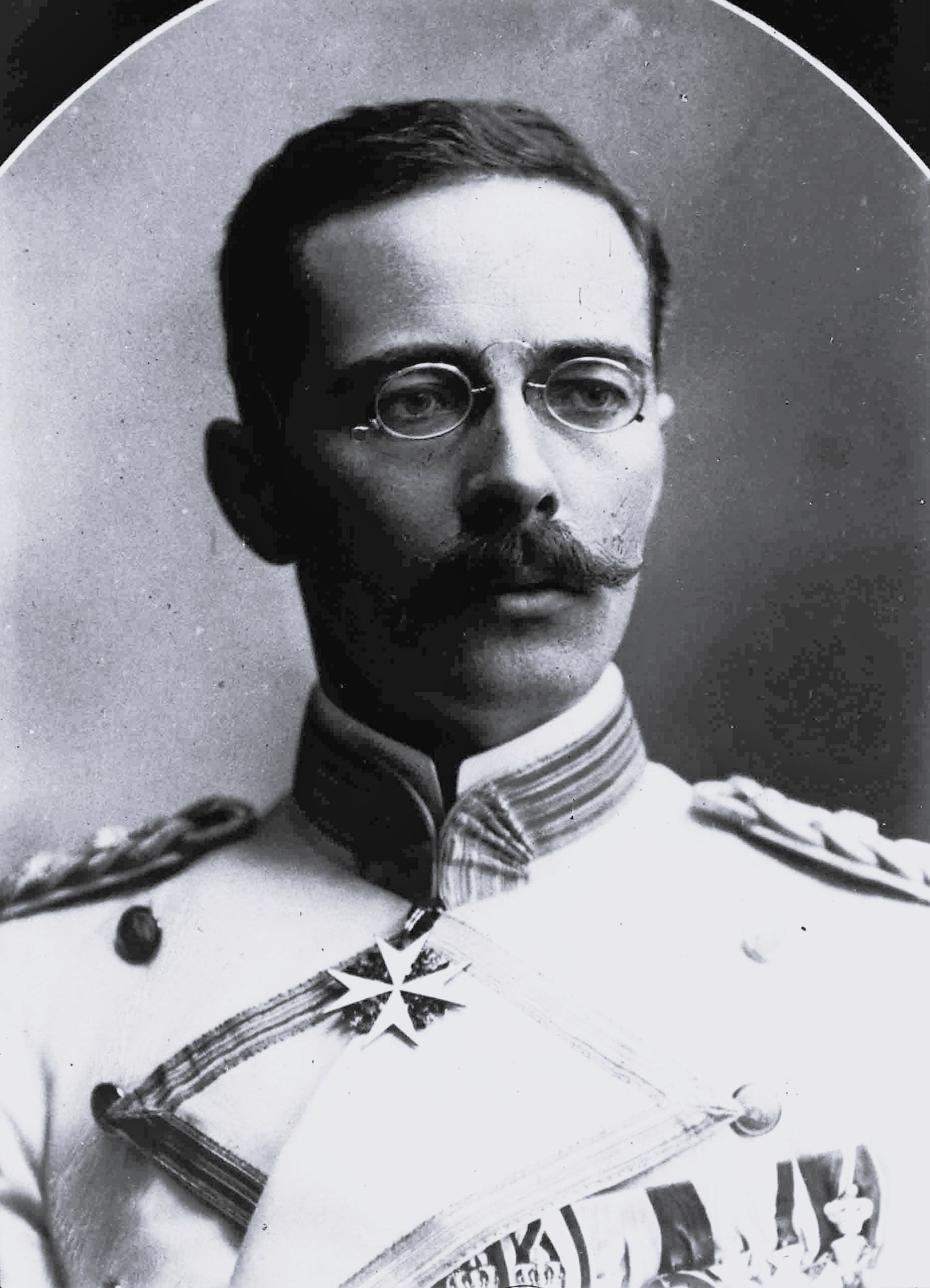

6th Reichskommissar of German East Africa
- In office 12 March 1901 – 15 April 1906
- Deputy: Friedrich Wilhelm von Lindeiner-Wildau
- Preceded by: Eduard von Liebert
- Succeeded by: Albrecht von Rechenberg

Personal details
- Born: 12 May 1866 Scharfeneck Castle, Kingdom of Prussia
- Died: 1 December 1910 (aged 44) Berlin, German Empire

Military service
- Allegiance: German Empire
- Branch/service: Imperial German Army; Schutztruppe
- Years of service: 1887–1908
- Rank: Major
- Battles/wars: German colonization of Africa; Spanish-American War (observer); Maji Maji Rebellion

Gustav Adolf Graf von Götzen (12 May 1866 – 1 December 1910) was a German explorer, colonial administrator, and military officer who served as Reichskommissar of German East Africa. He came to Rwanda in 1894 becoming the second European to enter the territory, since Oscar Baumann’s brief expedition in 1892, and later, he became the first European to cross the entire territory of Rwanda.

During the Maji Maji Rebellion of 1905, Götzen commanded the Schutztruppe against several rebelling African tribes in the German East Africa colony, quelling the uprising. The rebellion and famine that followed resulted in the deaths of up to 300,000 people.

== Early life and education ==
Count von Götzen was born into a comital family at their main residence, Scharfeneck Castle, back then in the Kingdom of Prussia. In present-day Poland and now called Sarny Castle, the castle and the adjoining summer palace, as well as the castle chapel in which he may have been baptized, still exist despite decades of disrepair in the communist era.

Von Götzen studied law at the universities of Paris, Berlin and Kiel between 1884 and 1887. He then joined the army, and became (in 1887) a Lieutenant in the 2nd Garde-Ulanen regiment. Between 1890 and 1891 he was stationed in Rome and it was from there that he made his first African trip, in a hunting expedition to Mount Kilimanjaro.

In 1892, having been made an officer in the War academy, Götzen travelled to the Ottoman Empire with Major Walther von Diest.

== Military career ==
=== Expeditions to Africa (1892–1896) ===
From 1885, Carl Peters had begun claiming areas of East Africa for Germany. The Tanganyikan coast proved relatively easy, but conquest of the inland areas of the colony – right up to the Belgian Congo –was more difficult as large parts were still unexplored. For this reason, Götzen led an expedition to claim these hinterlands. He took with him Georg von Prittwitz und Gaffron and Hermann Kersting.

The group set off from Pangani, on the Tanganyikan coast, on 21 December 1893. After travelling through Maasai areas, they eventually arrived, on 2 May 1894, at Rusumo Falls on the Kagera river. By crossing the river, the group entered in the Kingdom of Rwanda. At the time, it was one of the most organised and centralised kingdoms in the region. Götzen became the second European to set foot in Rwanda since Oscar Baumann's 1892 expedition. His group travelled right through Rwanda, meeting the mwami (king) Kigeli IV Rwabugiri at his palace in Kageyo, and eventually reaching Lake Kivu, the western edge of the kingdom.

After encountering and climbing some of the Virunga Mountains, Götzen decided to continue west through the Congolese jungle. With great effort, they managed to reach the Congo River on 21 September, which they then followed downstream, eventually reaching the Atlantic Ocean on 29 November. In January 1895, Götzen returned to Germany.

=== Service in America (1896–1901) ===
Between 1896 and 1898 Götzen worked as an attaché in Washington, D.C., and he served as an observer with Theodore Roosevelt during the Spanish–American War. While Götzen was there, he fell in love with the American widow of William Matthews Lay, May Loney, and married her. They had a daughter, Wanda Luise von Götzen, in 1898. Afterwards, he joined the general staff of the army in Berlin, where he was promoted in 1900 to the rank of Captain.

=== German East Africa and Maji Maji Rebellion (1901–1906) ===
Due to his knowledge of local conditions, Götzen was appointed governor of German East Africa in March 1901. There had already been rebellions by the native population in the 1880s and 1890s, and in 1905 Götzen was faced with outbreak of the Maji Maji Rebellion, which quickly took over about half of the colony. This was similar in severity to the Herero Wars taking place in German South-West Africa, but was noticed less by the German public. Götzen sent for reinforcements, and suppressed the rebellion by force. Götzen's troops lost 15 Europeans and 389 African soldiers, according to official data. Estimates of the numbers of Africans who died in the famine following the uprising range from 75,000, to 100-120,000, to 300,000, depending on the source consulted.

On 14 June 1906, Götzen later returned to Germany after submitting a report to the Foreign Office outlining what he believed were the causes of the Maji Maji Rebellion. The Foreign Office, keen to avoid a colonial scandal, accepted Götzen's report, and he retired ostensibly on the grounds of ill health. Following his retirement, the German government began to administer its overseas possessions under civilian control.

== Later life ==
Götzen's diplomatic career was almost at an end after his work as Governor. In early 1907 he was offered the minor post of a German envoy to Hamburg in which his duties would involve mostly accompanying the Kaiser through the city. This lighter amount of work gave Götzen the opportunity to publish a book DEUTSCH-OSTAFRIKA IM AUFSTAND, 1905-1906. In it, he attempted to justify his involvement in the Maji Maji Rebellion and the causes that prompted his response to quell the rebellion. This work was later published in 1909. Götzen still took an interest in the colonial politics of the German Empire; he was an active member of the committee for the German Colonial Society until his death on December 1, 1910 in a hospital in Schöneberg near Berlin. His wife outlived him by over two decades. They were buried together at the Ohlsdorf Cemetery in Hamburg.

== Legacy ==
The German passenger ship Graf von Götzen was named after Götzen and used as part of Germany's war effort on Lake Tanganyika in World War I. She was scuttled in July 1916 off the mouth of the Malagarasi River to prevent her falling into the hands of the Belgian troops. In 1924 on instructions from Winston Churchill, salvage operations by the Royal Navy succeeded in refloating the ship and in 1927 she returned to service as the M.V. Liemba and is still running today as a passenger cargo ferry.

Comparing von Götzen's actions to the Herero and Nama genocide, Mark Levene writes: "Operating with many fewer Schutzgruppe, considerably less money and appreciably less self-aggrandisement, von Götzen achieved essentially the same results by an entirely more effective but much less spectacular strategy than that initially adopted by his South-West African counterpart: starvation."

== Writings by Götzen ==
- Gustav Adolf von Götzen (1895). Durch Afrika von Ost nach West. D. Reimer. p. 1. "Gustav Adolf von Götzen.". Berlin (1895)
- Deutsch-Ostafrika im Aufstand 1905/06. Berlin (1909). English translation: German East Africa in Rebellion, 1905/06 (2019).
