= Grafenort concentration camp =

Nazi German concentration camp in Poland

Grafenort
- Nazi concentration camp
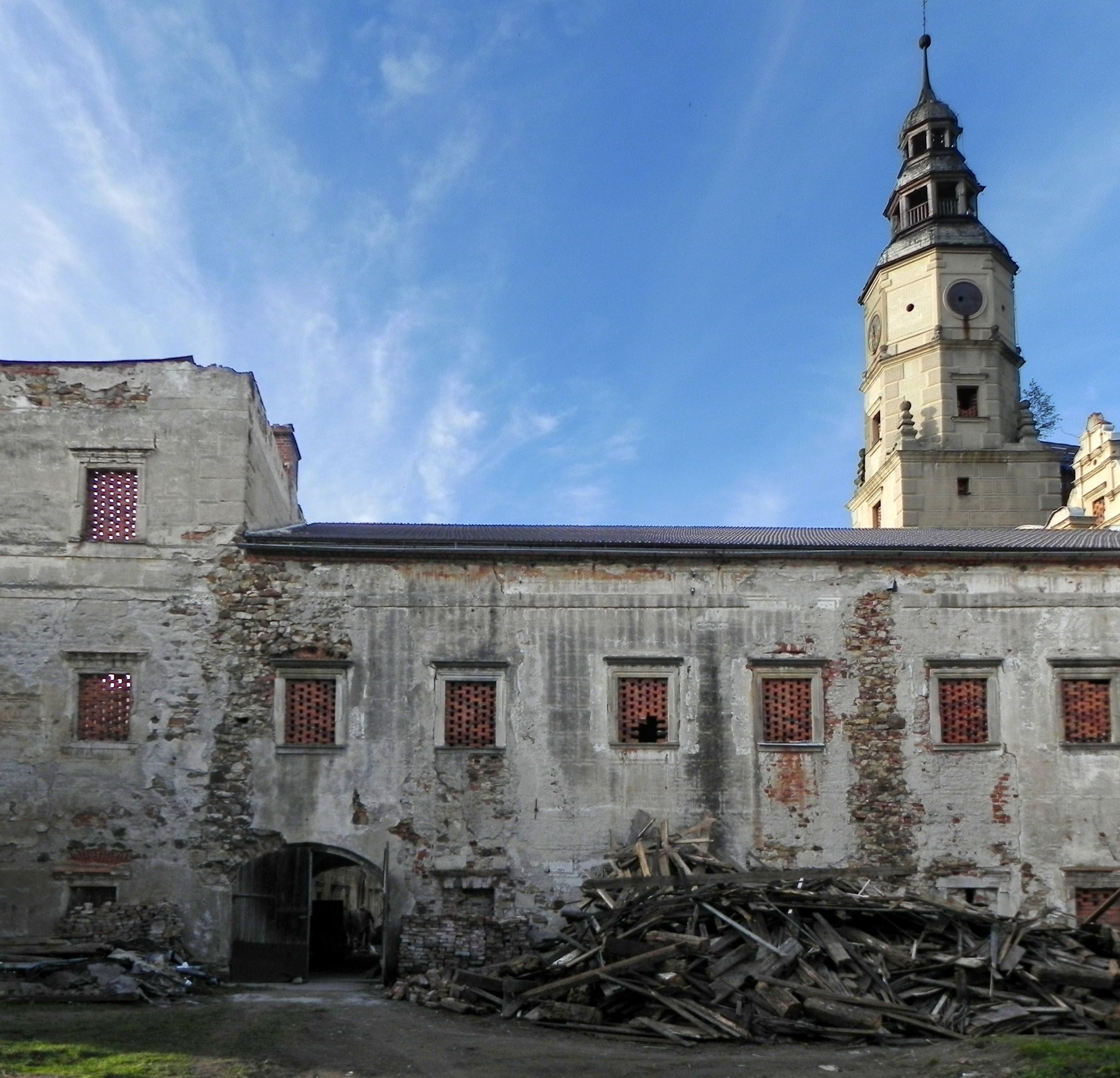
- View of Grafenort Castle (2012) former location of the Grafenort concentration camp

- Location of the former Grafenort concentration camp in Poland
- Coordinates: 50°21′3″N 16°37′0″E
- Other names: AL Grafenort; Arbeitslager Grafenort; FAL Grafenort; Frauenarbeitslager Grafenort; Gr-R/Graf; Lager Grafenort
- Known for: Construction of fortifications
- Location: Grafenort Castle (Ger., Schloß Grafenort, Pol., Pałac Gorzanów) ulica Podzamcze № 7/8 Gorzanów, Poland; Prison barracks on the outskirts of the same village (exact location uncertain)
- Operated by: German Schutzstaffel
- Original use: Stately residence (historic palace); Prison barracks
- First built: March 1944
- Operational: 1 March 1945 – 8 May 1945 (as an all-female subcamp of Gross-Rosen)
- Number of gas chambers: none
- Inmates: Women of Jewish ethnicity (deportees from Poland)
- Number of inmates: 250–400
- Killed: unknown
- Liberated by: Red Army of the Soviet Union
- Notable inmates: Ruth Minsky Sender
- Notable books: R. M. Sender, The Cage and To Life
- Website: www.gross-rosen.eu/historia-kl-gross-rosen/filie-obozu-gross-rosen/

The Grafenort concentration camp was a subcamp of the Gross-Rosen concentration camp located in Grafenort Castle, at modern Gorzanów in south-western Poland, which was operational throughout World War II.

For 68 days from 1 March 1945, the camp was run exclusively as a women's subcamp, with between 250-400 prisoners of Jewish ethnicity from the Łódź region, transferred from the Mittelsteine concentration camp. Despite initial illusions of luxury, the prisoners at Grafenort were subjected to slave labor, building fortifications, anti-tank trenches, against the advancing Eastern Front of the Allies. They were known for receiving the most brutal treatment of any female concentration camp.

Grafenort was one of thirteen Gross-Rosen subcamps located in the Giant Mountains, collectively holding over 13,000 prisoners, about 40% of whom perished. Positioned about 10.5 kilometres north of Bystrzyca Kłodzka in Lower Silesia, the camp was within proximity to significant locations like Wrocław and Prague. Grafenort Castle previously accommodated military garrisons.

The camp was liberated on 8 May 1945 by Soviet forces, emotionally affecting the first soldier to enter, a Russian Jew, upon discovering survivors. Among its notable inmates was writer Ruth Minsky Sender.

== Overview ==
Located in an expropriated Renaissance castle, the concentration camp was operational throughout the War, but for 68 days (2 months and a week) was formally run as an all-female subcamp (Frauenarbeitslager) of Gross-Rosen between 1 March 1945 and 8 May 1945 (the latter being the date of its liberation by the Soviets) in the aftermath of the strategic liquidation of the Mittelsteine concentration camp in the latter weeks of the War—a move which the Nazis initiated owing to the advancing Eastern Front. In the course of liquidating Mittelsteine, the Nazis transferred between 250 and 300 female prisoners from Mittelsteine to Grafenort. Some sources put the documented number of prisoners evacuated from Mittelsteine to Grafenort in April 1945 at 400. All of the prisoners in the transfer were women of Jewish ethnicity originally deported from the region of Łódź. The distance between the Mittelsteine and Grafenort concentration camps is about 21 kilometres (13 miles) as the crow flies or 28 km (17 mi) by road. The reasons behind the liquidation of the Mittelsteine concentration camp and the transfer of its inmates to two other camps—one of them being Grafenort—have not been fully understood by historians. (See also the history of the Mittelsteine concentration camp.)

The Grafenort concentration camp was one of the group of thirteen subcamps of Gross-Rosen located in the Giant Mountains (Riesengebirge) which were concentrated primarily in the region of the Owl Mountains. The group of camps held collectively over 13,000 prisoners, of whom approximately 40 percent perished from hunger and exhaustion brought about by slave labour.

=== Location ===
The camp was situated in the locality called since the latter part of the 17th century Grafenort (renamed Gorzanów after 1945) in what was at the time of the camp's existence the territory of the Third Reich, about 10½ kilometres to the north of Bystrzyca Kłodzka (German: Habelschwerdt), the nearest larger town—within the region of Lower Silesia.

The regional metropolis of Wrocław (Ger., Breslau) is 103 kilometres (64 miles) to the north-east, while Prague in the Czech Republic is 203 km (126 mi) away in the opposite direction.

=== The camp ===
The camp was located on the premises of Grafenort Castle. Grafenort Castle had been used for the quartering of military garrisons (as large as 200 strong) in earlier times. Some works of reference indicate simply a preexisting "masonry building" (murowany budynek) lying on the periphery of the village as the site of the camp. Sara Zyskind, a survivor, recalls that the truck in which the female prisoners were deported from Mittelsteine to Grafenort pulled up in front of one of the mansions of which the village of Grafenort was full, but one "much larger than the others and situated somewhat apart"—which is consistent with the description of Grafenort Castle. Another famous survivor, Sara Selver-Urbach, writes about the prisoners' delusions indulged in for the sake of mutual moral support and survival:

Already in Mittelsteine, we heard about the princely palaces in which we would be housed [at the new camp in Grafenort — explanation added], about the regal, magnificent beds that would be ours, about the gold plate off which we would be served meat and every other delicacy. Scornfully, we'd tell each other those tales with cynical disbelief.
But the joke was of another kind altogether. The old building of the new camp had indeed been a regal palace previously, but its looks and accommodations have been transformed thoroughly for the purpose of housing us. The first impression was a shock: all the windows were boarded and barred with barbed wire, exactly like the Gypsy compound adjoining the Lodz Ghetto. Our second impression, when we entered the "Palatial Hall", was even more horrifying: the place was not divided into "rooms" and contained no bunks whatsoever, not even our former tiered shelves. All the inmates lay sprawled on the floor, all of them together in that one single hall which, to us, looked suddenly like a morgue, filthy blankets, bulging pallets almost glued to one another all over the floor.

However, the physical description of the camp in the report of Ruth Minsky Sender, another survivor, differs markedly, suggesting more than one facility associated with the Grafenort concentration camp. Sender, in her book The Cage, speaks about "many barracks spread about a large field" with "rows and rows of wooden bunks reach[ing] to the ceiling". Clearly, the Grafenort concentration camp consisted of at least two parts where the prisoners were held.

The slave labour consisted in building fortifications (anti-tank trenches) against the advancing Eastern Front of the Allies, and the camp was perhaps the most notorious among all Nazi female concentration camps for the brutality of the treatment of prisoners. Bella Gutterman, the director of the International Institute for Holocaust Research, singles out Grafenort as the only camp where women prisoners were employed exactly like men in gruelling excavation work.

=== Liberation ===
The Grafenort concentration camp was liberated, according to best sources, on 8 May 1945. Some sources indicate the date of the liberation of the camp as 7 May 1945 or 9 May 1945. According to the information collected by the Holocaust Education & Archive Research Team and other researchers, no Gross-Rosen subcamp was liberated on 7 May—all of the Gross-Rosen subcamps were liberated between 8 and 9 May 1945. The first Soviet soldier to enter Grafenort, a Russian Jew, was overcome with emotion when he realized that there were still some survivors left at the camp.

== Notable inmates ==
- Ruth Minsky Sender, writer

== Bibliography ==
- Obozy hitlerowskie na ziemiach polskich 1939–1945: informator encyklopedyczny, ed. Cz. Pilichowski, et al. (for the Główna Komisja Badania Zbrodni Hitlerowskich w Polsce and the Rada Ochrony Pomników Walki i Męczeństwa), Warsaw, Państwowe Wydawnictwo Naukowe, 1979, p. 509. ISBN 8301000651.
- Alfred Konieczny, Kobiety w obozie koncentracyjnym Gross-Rosen w latach 1944–1945, Wrocław, Zakład Narodowy im. Ossolińskich, 1982.
- Roman Mogilanski, comp. & ed., The Ghetto Anthology: A Comprehensive Chronicle of the Extermination of Jewry in Nazi Death Camps and Ghettos in Poland, rev. B. Grey, Los Angeles, American Congress of Jews from Poland and Survivors of Concentration Camps, 1985, page 246.
- Zygmunt Zonik, Anus belli: ewakuacja i wyzwolenie hitlerowskich obozów koncentracyjnych, Warsaw, Państwowe Wydawnictwo Naukowe, 1988. ISBN 8301083255. (Inconceivably, the Grafenort concentration camp is misnamed "Grafendorf [sic!]" in this source.)
- Encyclopedia of the Holocaust, ed. I. Gutman, vol. 1, New York, Macmillan Publishing Company, 1995, pages 624–625. ISBN 0028960904. OK
- Enzyklopädie des Holocaust: die Verfolgung und Ermordung der europäischen Juden, ed. E. Jäckel, et al., vol. 1, Berlin, Argon, 1993, page 571. ISBN 3870243007, ISBN 3870243015.
- Women in the Holocaust: A Collection of Testimonies, comp. & tr. J. Eibeshitz & A. Eilenberg-Eibeshitz, vol. 2, Brooklyn (New York), Remember, 1994, pages 67, 204–205. ISBN 0932351468, ISBN 0932351476.
- Alfred Konieczny, Frauen im Konzentrationslager Groß-Rosen in den Jahren 1944–1945, Wałbrzych, Państwowe Muzeum Gross-Rosen, 1994.
- Benjamin and Vladka Meed Registry of Jewish Holocaust Survivors, vol. 2, Washington, D.C., United States Holocaust Memorial Council in cooperation with the American Gathering of Jewish Holocaust Survivors, 1996, pages 267–268. ISBN 0896041581.
- Studia nad Faszyzmem i Zbrodniami Hitlerowskimi, ed. K. Jonca, vol. 22 (2136), Wrocław, Wydawnictwo Uniwersytetu Wrocławskiego, 1999, page 375. ISBN 8322920474. ISSN 0239-6661, ISSN 0137-1126. (An extremely important source.)
- Edward Basałygo, 900 lat Jeleniej Góry: Tędy przeszła historia: Kalendarium wydarzeń w Kotlinie Jeleniogórskiej i jej okolicach, Jelenia Góra, 2010. (See online.)
- Andrzej Strzelecki, Deportacja Żydów z getta łódzkiego do KL Auschwitz i ich zagłada: opracowanie i wybór źródeł, ed. T. Świebocka, Oświęcim, Państwowe Muzeum Auschwitz-Birkenau, 2004. ISBN 8388526804.
- Filie obozu koncentracyjnego Gross-Rosen: informator, Wałbrzych, Muzeum Gross-Rosen, 2008, pp. 35, and passim. ISBN 9788389824073. OK
- Der Ort des Terrors: Geschichte der nationalsozialistischen Konzentrationslager, eds. W. Benz & B. Distel, et al., vol. 8 (Riga–Kaiserwald, Warschau, Vaivara, Kauen (Kaunas), Płaszów, Kulmhof/Chełmno, Bełżec, Sobibór, Treblinka), Munich, Beck, 2008, p. 324. ISBN 9783406572371. OK
- Bella Gutterman, A Narrow Bridge to Life: Jewish Forced Labor and Survival in the Gross-Rosen Camp System, 1940–1945, tr. IBRT, New York, Berghahn Books, 2008. ISBN 9781845452063, ISBN 1845452062.
- The United States Holocaust Memorial Museum Encyclopedia of Camps and Ghettos, 1933–1945, ed. Geoffrey P. Megargee, vol. 1 (Early Camps, Youth Camps, and Concentration Camps and Subcamps under the SS-Business Administration Main Office (WVHA)), Bloomington (Indiana), Indiana University Press, in association with the United States Holocaust Memorial Museum, 2009, pages 700, 737–738, 766. ISBN 9780253354297. OK

== See also ==
- Mittelsteine concentration camp
- Gross-Rosen concentration camp
- List of subcamps of Gross Rosen
- List of Nazi concentration camps
- History of children in the Holocaust
