= Sara Zyskind =

Israeli writer

- שרה זיסקינד
- Born: Sara Rachela Plager (or Sara Rachela Plagier); 26 March 1927; Warsaw
- Died: 1 January 1995 (aged 67); Tel-Aviv
- Occupation: Writer on the Holocaust
- Spouse(s): Eliezer (Elazar) Zyskind (b. 22 June 1925 in Brzeziny; husband from 1948)
- Writing career
- Pen name: Sala Plagier (childhood name); Sara Plager-Zyskind; Sara Plagier-Zyskind
- Period: Post-War period
- Genre: Memoirs

Sara Zyskind, also Sara Plager-Zyskind (Hebrew: שרה פלגר-זיסקינד) (b. 26 March 1927 in Łódź; d. 1 January 1995 in Tel-Aviv), was a prominent Polish–Israeli writer on the Holocaust. She was a survivor of the Łódź Ghetto, and of the Auschwitz, the Mittelsteine concentration camp, and the Grafenort Nazi concentration camps. Her style as a writer on the Holocaust has been praised for its effective literary technique that allows the reader to identify with the reality of the period. Her writings constitute valuable primary sources in Holocaust historiography.

== Life ==
Sara Zyskind was born in Łódź to the family of Anschel (Anszel) Kalman Plager (1897–1943), a native of Drohobycz, and his wife Mindla, née Biederman (1900–1940), who came from a well-known family of Łódź industrialists. (At least on some occasions, Zyskind will spell her maiden name "Sala Plagier": see External links below.) Zyskind's childhood in Łódź was a very happy one, as she was swaddled in love and support from family members.

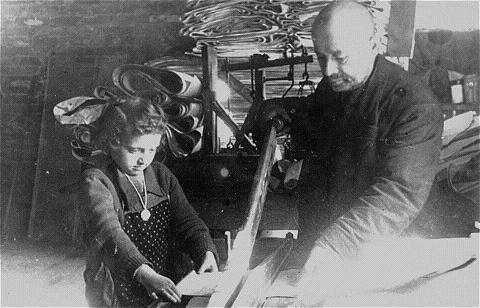
An unidentified girl child works in the paper factory in the Łódź Ghetto

At the age of 12 she saw her world crushing down around her after the Nazis invaded her town on 8 September 1939. Within three months of the occupation the town's residents of Jewish origin were required to move into a newly designated Ghetto, which was subsequently declared off limits to outsiders on 8 February 1940 and sealed to the outside world on 1 May 1940. Her mother, who endured the ensuing privations with uncommon tact and cheerfulness, died the same year. She and her father mutually supported each other during the following years, successfully evading arrest and deportation, until he died during the Passover of 1943.

Upon the "liquidation" of the Ghetto Zyskind was deported to Auschwitz in August 1944, at the age of 16 (her inmate number was 55091), and thence to the Mittelsteine Nazi concentration camp, 17 kilometres to the north-west of Kłodzko (Ger., Glatz), the latter being then an all-female subcamp of the Gross-Rosen, and subsequently to the Grafenort Nazi concentration camp, 27 kilometres away (12 km south of Kłodzko), where at the end of the War the hundreds of prisoners held there (virtually all Jewish women deported from the Łódź area) were worked at a murderous pace building trenches in the Nazis' frantic attempts to fortify their retreat against the advancing Soviet forces — and where Zyskind concluded that she would not be able survive her wartime ordeal. She writes:

The work was far beyond our capacity. We were nothing but living skeletons, unable to lift the shovelfuls of heavy soil above our heads, let alone work at the speed demanded of us.

After the liberation she returned to Łódź in the spring of 1945, at the age of 17, only to find her entire world of human relations completely wiped out, at which time she decided to emigrate to Palestine. She left Poland on forged wartime papers with a group of other refugees from Łódź. (Zyskind would not return to Poland until 1988 when she, then aged 61, together with her husband and their three children would visit Łódź and Auschwitz.) Aided by a Jewish relief group called Escape, they wandered across Europe for two years, crossing national frontiers surreptitiously. She finally reached Palestine on 15 May 1947. Because of British restrictions on Jewish emigration.

David Patterson wrote about Sara Zyskind in his monograph about the memoirs of Holocaust survivors:

The essence of Nazism was murder, and the target of Nazi murder was the image and essence of the human being; it was the image of the divine that makes this being human, which is to say, it was the being-for-the-other of human being. (...) Sara Zyskind remembers, "Our friendship and our care for one another enabled us to preserve something of our humanity..."

Together with Eliezer Zyskind, Sara participated in armed combat in the First Arab-Israeli War of 1948. In December 1948 she married Eliezer Zyskind (b. 1925), a native of Brzeziny, a locality 24 kilometres distant from her native Łódź. Her brother was a co-founder of the first textile mill in Tel-Aviv.

== Works ==
- (1977) העטרה שאבדה : בגיטו לודז׳ ובמחנות
- Stolen Years (1981; translation of ha-ʻAṭarah she-avda)
- Bet loḥame ha-geṭaʼot (1985)
- Struggle (1988; translation of Maʾavako shel naʻar)
- Światło w dolinie łez (1994)

== See also ==
- History of children in the Holocaust
- Polish culture during World War II
- Ruth Minsky Sender

== Bibliography ==
- "A Second Opinion" (letters to the editor), Children's Literature Association Quarterly (Baltimore (Maryland), The Johns Hopkins University Press), vol. 9, No. 4 (1984), page 203.
- D. H. R. [sic], "Sara Zyskind: Struggle", West Coast Review of Books (Los Angeles), vol. 14 (1988), page 44. ISSN 0095-3555. (Review of Struggle.)
- Bibliographic Guide to Soviet and East European Studies, vol. 3 (R–Z), Boston, G. K. Hall, 1991, pages 418 & 838. ISSN 0162-5322.
- Mary Ann Paulin, More Creative Uses of Children's Literature, Hamden (Connecticut), Library Professional Publications, 1992, pages 41, 450. ISBN 0208022031, ISBN 0208022023.
- Women in the Holocaust: A Collection of Testimonies, comp. & tr. J. Eibeshitz & A. Eilenberg-Eibeshitz, vol. 2, Brooklyn (New York), Remember, 1994. ISBN 0932351468, ISBN 0932351476.
- Anna Eilenberg-Eibeshitz, Preserved Evidence: Ghetto Lodz, 2 vols., Haifa, H. Eibeshitz Institute for Holocaust Studies, 1998–2000. ISBN 9657134005.
- David Patterson, Sun Turned to Darkness: Memory and Recovery in the Holocaust Memoir, Syracuse (New York), Syracuse University Press, 1998, passim. ISBN 0815605307. (Detailed analysis of selected aspects of Zyskind's narratives.)
- David Patterson, "The Moral Dilemma of Motherhood in the Nazi Death Camps"; in: Problems Unique to the Holocaust, ed. H. J. Cargas, Lexington (Kentucky), University Press of Kentucky, 1999, page 12. ISBN 0813121019.
- Karl Liedke, Das KZ-Außenlager Schillstraße in Braunschweig 1944–1945, Braunschweig, Appelhans, 2006. ISBN 9783937664385. (On Eliezer Zyskind.)
- David Patterson, Open Wounds: The Crisis of Jewish Thought in the Aftermath of Auschwitz, Seattle, University of Washington Press, 2006, page 140. ISBN 029598645X, ISBN 9780295986456.
- Andrzej Strzelecki, The Deportation of Jews from the Łódź Ghetto to KL Auschwitz and Their Extermination: A Description of the Events and the Presentation of Historical Sources, tr. W. Kościa-Zbirohowski, Oświęcim, Auschwitz-Birkenau State Museum, 2006, pp. 12, 97. ISBN 8360210187. (Cited as "Sara Plagier".)
- Isaiah Trunk, Łódź Ghetto: A History, tr. & ed. R. M. Shapiro, Bloomington (Indiana), Indiana University Press, 2006. ISBN 0253347556, ISBN 9780253347558. (For background.)
- Gordon J. Horwitz, Ghettostadt: Łódź and the Making of a Nazi City, Cambridge (Massachusetts), The Belknap Press of Harvard University Press, 2008, pages 326, 327, 329, 362. ISBN 9780674027992, ISBN 067402799X.
- Zoë Waxman, "Testimony and Silence: Sexual Violence and the Holocaust"; in: Feminism, Literature and Rape Narratives: Violence and Violation, ed. S. Gunne & Z. Brigley Thompson, New York City, Routledge, 2010, page 118. ISBN 9780415806084, ISBN 0415806089.
- Zoë V. Waxman, "Towards an Integrated History of the Holocaust: Masculinity, Femininity, and Genocide"; in: Years of Persecution, Years of Extermination: Saul Friedlander and the Future of Holocaust Studies, ed. C. Wiese & P. Betts, London & New York City, Continuum, 2010, page 317. ISBN 9781441189370, ISBN 1441189378, ISBN 9781441129871, ISBN 1441129871.
- The United States Holocaust Memorial Museum, Washington, D.C., online Holocaust Encyclopedia, s.v. "Sara Rachela Plagier".
