= Grafenort =

Grafenort may refer to:

- The German name for the village of Gorzanów, in Kłodzko County, Lower Silesian Voivodeship, Poland
- The settlement of Grafenort (Engelberg), in the municipality of Engelberg in the Swiss canton of Obwalden
