= Gorzanów Castle =

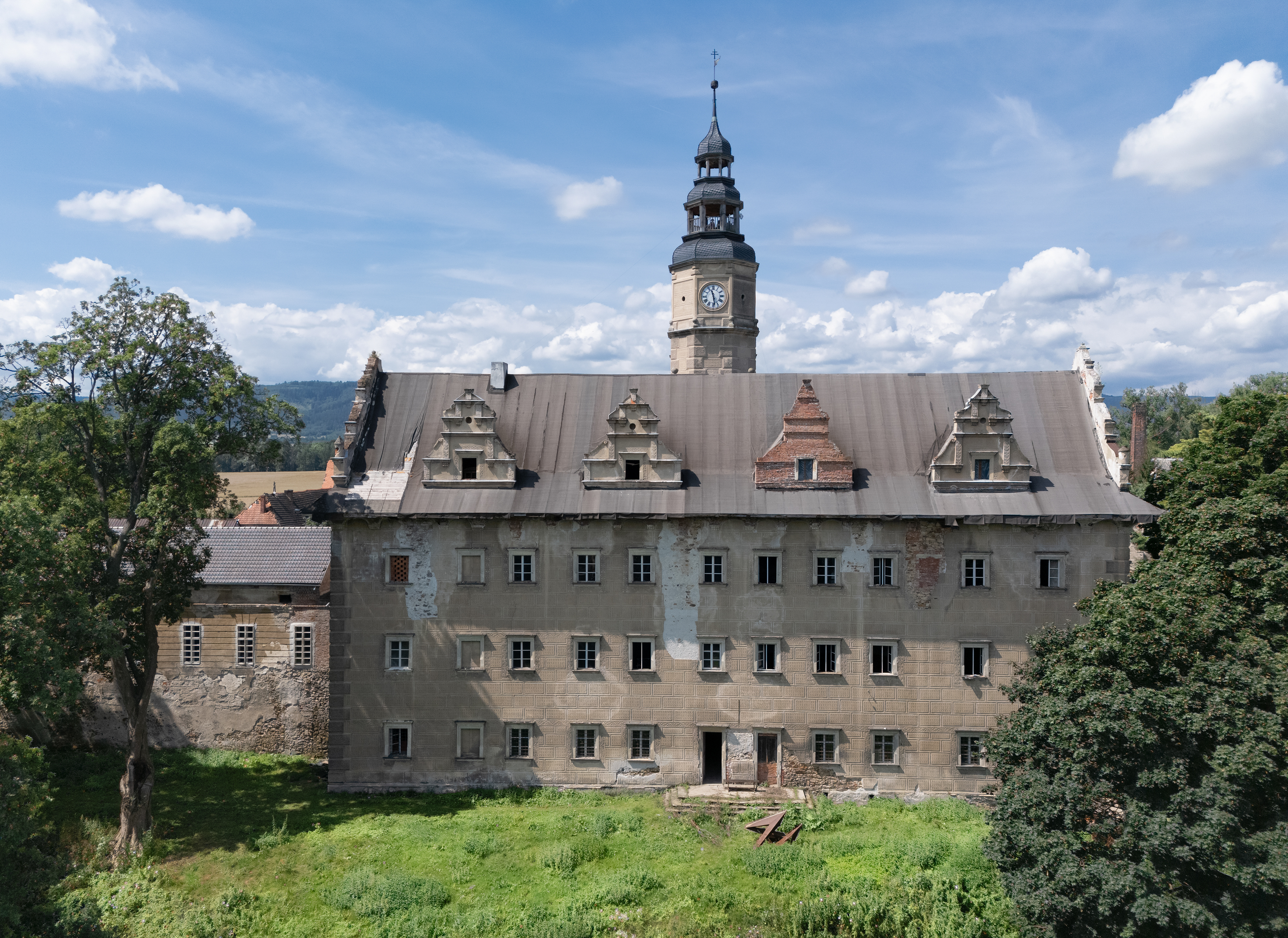
- Gorzanów Castle

- Location of Gorzanów Castle in Poland Gorzanów Castle (Lower Silesian Voivodeship)
- 50°21′3.33″N 16°37′59.65″E
- Location: Gorzanów, Poland

History
- Built: 1573
- Demolished: Second World War and Post-war period (serious damage, including partial but not total demolition of parts of palace complex)
- Rebuilt: 1653–1657; 1737

Site notes
- Area: Kłodzko Land ♣ Lower Silesia
- Architectural style: High Renaissance
- Governing body: Privately owned

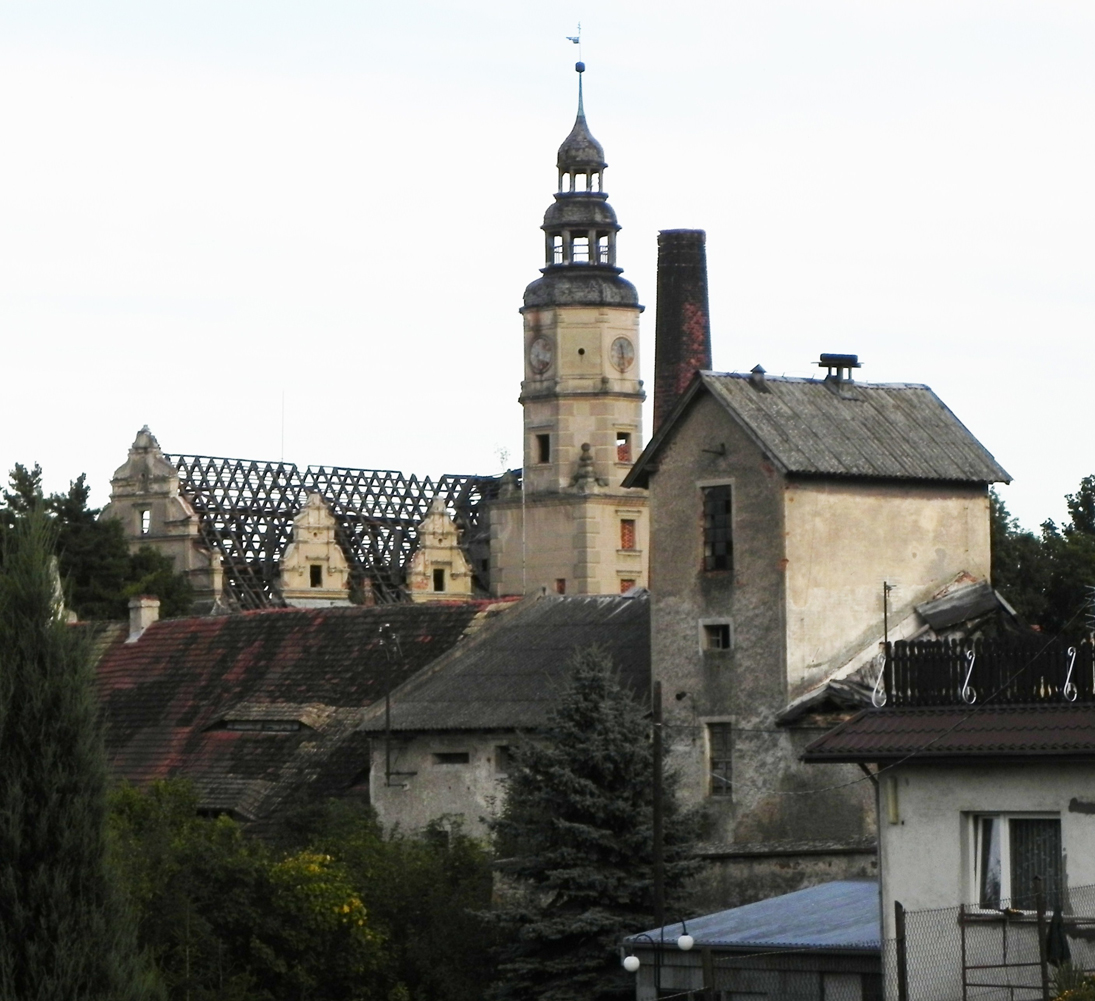
Current state of the Castle's brewery (2012)

Gorzanów Castle (German: Schloß Grafenort, Polish: Pałac Gorzanów; Silesian: Zōmek Gorzanowy) is a former stately residence in the Kłodzko Land of the Lower Silesia. A 16th-century German foundation, it has been in the hands of the von Herberstein family of Grafs or Counts (the Grafen von Herberstein) since the second half of the seventeenth century until 1930 — hence its name, and one of the former names of the village in which it is situated.

== Overview ==
The village of the Castle's location was called Arnoldsdorf between at least 1341 (the earliest extant record) and 1670. For the next 275 years between 1670 and 1945 the village's name was Grafenort ("the Seat of the Counts", with reference to the von Herberstein family). In 1945, after the accession of Lower Silesia to Poland, the locality was renamed Gorzanów by the Polish authorities.

The Castle, situated at an elevation of c. 329 m (1,079 ft) above sea level and comprising over 100 interior chambers within its structure, is surrounded by 6.6 ha (16 acres) of parkland (palace gardens) that once were one its greatest glories (see historical lithographs below), the views extending from some vantage points being described as having a mesmeric effect on the viewer.

The Castle has historical associations with Cardinal Ernst Adalbert of Harrach (1598–1667), the bishop of Trent, who in his Italian diaries for 1663–1664 refers to Grafenort alternately as Arnsdorff, Arnßdorff, or Arnßdorf, and the composer Ignaz Reimann (1820–1885; buried at the nearby Krosnowice). The poet and actor Karl von Holtei (1798–1880) who began his career as an actor at Grafenort Castle mentions it repeatedly in his pleasantly amusing, light-hearted biography, Vierzig Jahre ("Forty Years"). He says he spent thirty years of his life in the Castle; on a return visit he muses about the rooms

in which I dwelt, made love, watched people die, cohabited with the survivors, poetized, quarrelled with the Count, written plays, learned roles, managed the theatre, made plans for the future, and God knows what else?

The foreword in his 1840 play Shakspear in der Heimath is dated July 1839 at "Schloß Grafenort". In another of his works Holtei speaks of Schloß Grafenort as the ancient edifice that is the oasis of hospitality whose "brightly coloured gabled halls look up towards the Silesian Králický Sněžník" (the mountain is about 22 km away). His 333-page edition of twelve letters written "from and to Grafenort" between July 1839 and May 1840 (Briefe aus und nach Grafenort, published in 1841) are a treasure trove of information on the Castle.

The Polish scholar Filip Sulimierski (1843–1885), editor of the monumental Słownik geograficzny Królestwa Polskiego (1881), describes the property as "the beautiful castle of the Herberstein counts" in which theatrical performances were given three times a week for eight months of the year (see Bibliography). Apart from pieces of mainstream dramatic literature, the Castle's theatre staged ("with great pomp", according to contemporary accounts) a special genre of "Jesuit dramas" under the patronage of the Grafen von Herberstein.

A large number of photographs of the Castle's exterior and interior, and its outlying structures, including details of the Castle's unique architectural features (such as its sgraffiti-clad windows), are published in Richard Konwiarz's book Alt-Schlesien (1913). The book speaks of the Castle's front staircase leading to the garden as the historically significant architectural element, and the gardens themselves with their intricate layout as ranking on the same level of importance. A photograph of the theatre's interior, including the stage and the seating area, was published in the monthly periodical Schlesische Monatshefte: Blätter für Kultur und Schrifttum der Heimat of March 1933.

The numerous pictorial representations of Gorzanów Palace include works of Friedrich Bernhard Werner (1690–1776) and Josef Schall (1785–1867).

== Nazi period ==
From 1930, the palace complex was the property of the town of Habelschwerdt (renamed Bystrzyca Kłodzka after 1945), and as public property it lent itself easily to Nazi use. During the Second World War, while the region of Lower Silesia was German territory, Gorzanów Castle was the site of the notorious Grafenort concentration camp, a place of oppression of Jewish women deported here from Poland, a war crime under the Geneva Convention.

== Post-war period ==
In 1945, the region of Lower Silesia became part of Poland. The years that followed marked the period of continuing degradation of Grafenort Castle began already during the Nazi rule. Polish press reports and notices in tourist guidebooks spoke of a shocking state of disrepair of a property that was considered unfit to be visited by sightseers, its decline from lack of maintenance hastened by depredations of masonry robbers and other types of active vandalism. Anything that could be carried was stolen.

After 57 years of neglect and such continuous pillage and plunder as the property was subjected to since the beginning of the Second World War, the ownership of the Castle was acquired in 1996 by an Austrian national who — despite promises of restoration of the Castle to its former glory — did nothing during the ensuing 14 years to rehabilitate the property or even just to stem the ongoing decay. In this way the period of decline was extended from 57 years to 71 years. Then, in October 2010, the Castle was purchased by yet another investor, said to belong to old Polish nobility, a development which again raised the hopes of the local population (including the mayor of the neighbouring Bystrzyca Kłodzka, the administrative seat of the gmina) that the Castle might be rescued from irreversible collapse. Instead of fulfilment of these hopes, however, there are signs of plans to turn the property into a commercial enterprise servicing the hospitality industry as a wedding hall. The latest reports (including those of the conservation group Zabytki Śląska) suggest the continuing neglect of the property while the new owner searches for a "business partner". Gorzanów Castle is included in the 2009 book Silesia: The Land of Dying Country Houses published by the conservation group Save Europe's Heritage in London (see Bibliography).

== Bibliography ==
- Ed. Ludw. Wedekind (Eduard Ludwig Wedekind), Geschichte der Grafschaft Glatz: Chronik der Städte, Flecken, Dörfer, Kolonien, Schlösser &c. dieser souverainen Grafschaft von der frühesten Vergangenheit bis auf die Gegenwart, Neurode, Verlag von Frdr. Wilh. Fischer, 1857, pages 687–688, and passim.
- Filip Sulimierski, s.v. "Grafenort"; in: Słownik geograficzny Królestwa Polskiego i innych krajów słowiańskich, ed. F. Sulimierski, et al., vol. 2, Warsaw, Nakładem F. Sulimierskiego i W. Walewskiego, 1881, page 791, col. 1. (See online.)
- Richard Konwiarz, comp. & ed., Alt-Schlesien: Architektur, Raumkunst, Kunstgewerbe, Stuttgart, Verlag von Julius Hoffmann, 1913, pp. 68–78.
- Maximilian Tschitschke, "Der Bauernaufstand in der Herrschaft Grafenort 1679/90", Glatzer Heimatblätter, No. 17, 1931, pp. 57–69.
- Gerard Ciołek, Ogrody polskie: przemiany treści i formy, Warsaw, Budownictwo i Architektura, 1954.
- Helmut Sieber, Burgen und Schlösser in Schlesien: Nach alten Stichen (vol. 2 of Schlösser und Herrensitze in Schlesien), Frankfurt, Verlag Wolfgang Weidlich, 1962.
- Albert A. Scholz, Silesia Yesterday and Today, The Hague, M. Nijhoff, 1964, pages 11–12, 18.
- Helmut Sieber, Schlösser in Schlesien: Ein Handbuch, Frankfurt a.M., Verlag Wolfgang Weidlich, 1971, pages 11, 64–67, 80. ISBN 3803503329.
- Konstanty Kalinowski, Architektura barokowa na Śląsku w drugiej połowie XVII wieku, Wrocław, Zakład Narodowy im. Ossolińskich (Polska Akademia Nauk, Instytut Sztuki), 1974.
- Günther Grundmann, Burgen, Schlösser und Gutshäuser in Schlesien, vol. 2 (Schlösser und feste Häuser der Renaissance, ed. D. Grossmann), Würzburg, Verlag Weidlich, 1987. ISBN 380351309X.
- Dieter Pohl, Die Grafschaft Glatz (Schlesien) in Darstellungen und Quellen: eine erweiterte Bibliographie, Modautal, Pohl, 1995. ISBN 3927830100.
- Hanna Faryna-Paszkiewicz, et al., Atlas zabytków architektury w Polsce, Warsaw, Wydawnictwo Naukowe PWN, 2001, pages 17 F, 371–372. ISBN 830113478X.
- Marzanna Jagiełło-Kołaczyk, Sgraffita na Śląsku, 1540–1650, Wrocław, Oficyna Wydawnicza Politechniki Wrocławskiej, 2003. ISBN 8370857000.
- Józef Pilch, Leksykon zabytków architektury Dolnego Śląska, Warsaw, Wydawnictwo Arkady, 2005. ISBN 832134366X.
- Marcus Binney, Kit Martin & Wojciech Wagner, Silesia: The Land of Dying Country Houses, London, Save Europe's Heritage, 2009. ISBN 9780905978604, ISBN 0905978609.
- Romuald M. Łuczyński, Losy rezydencji dolnośląskich w latach 1945–1991, Wrocław, Oficyna Wydawnicza Atut & Wrocławskie Wydawnictwo Oświatowe, 2010. ISBN 9788374326858, ISBN 8374326859.
- "Nowy Pałac / Schloss Grafenort" — a historical outline with an extensive gallery of historical photographs (See online.)

== See also ==
- Castles in Poland
- Objects of cultural heritage in Poland
