= Mittelsteine =

Nazi concentration camp in Poland

Mittelsteine concentration camp
- Nazi concentration camp
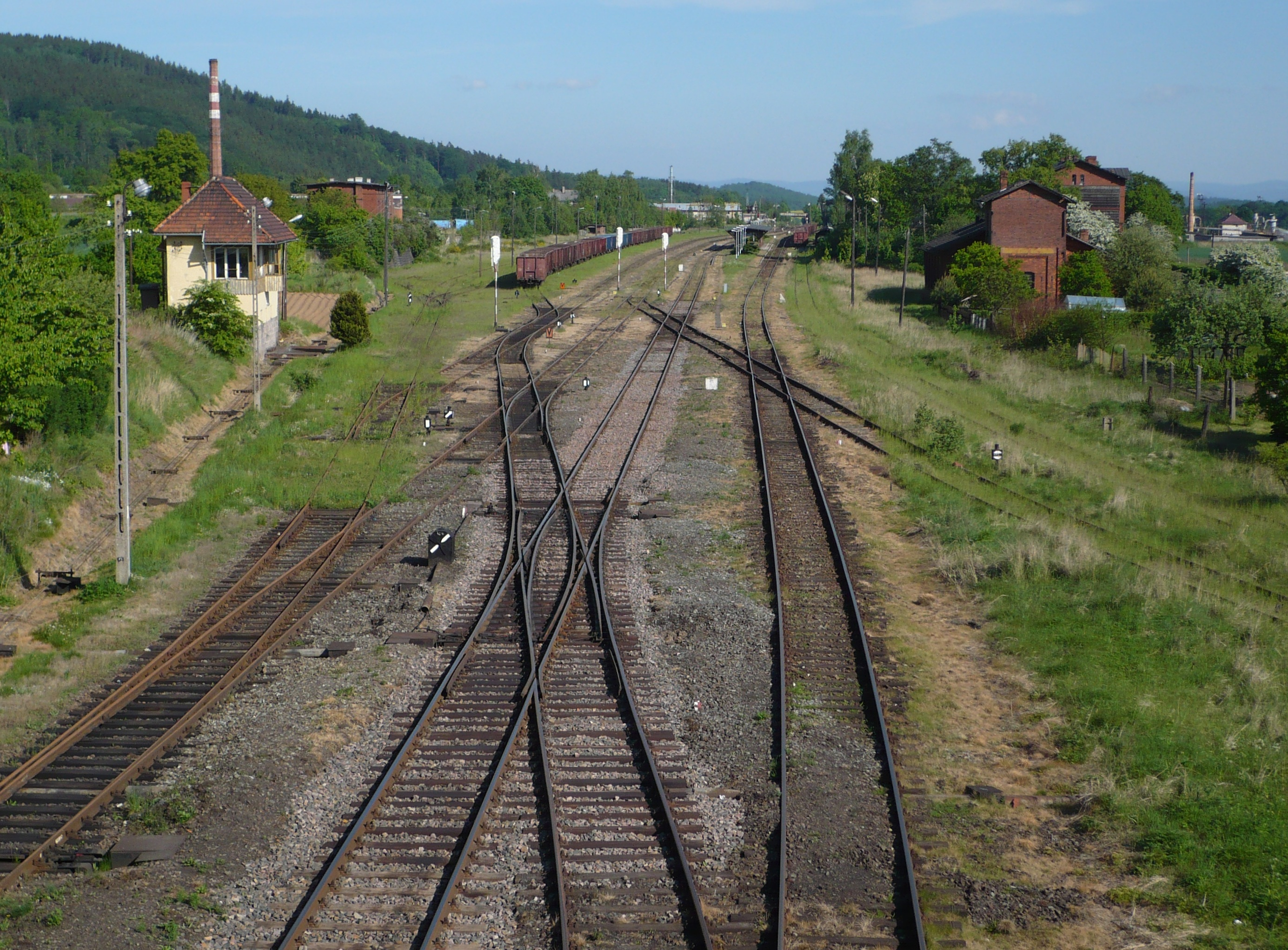
- View of Mittelsteine railway junction (2009) c. 2.12 km (1.32 mi) from the camp as the crow flies

- Location of Mittelsteine in present-day Poland
- Coordinates: 50°30′55″N 16°29′2″E
- Other names: AL Mittelsteine; Arbeitslager Mittelsteine; Gr-R/Mitt; Lager Mittelsteine
- Known for: Production of V-1 and V-2 rocket components
- Location: Voivodeship Route DW 387; Ścinawka Średnia, Poland
- Operated by: German Schutzstaffel (SS)
- Original use: Barracks custom-built for the purpose
- First built: 1942
- Operational: 23 Aug. 1944 – 30 April 1945
- Number of gas chambers: none
- Inmates: Women of Jewish ethnicity (only deportees from Hungary and Poland)
- Number of inmates: 300–1,000
- Liberated by: Evacuated by the Nazis prior to the arrival of Allied forces
- Notable inmates: Marietta Moskin; Sara Selver-Urbach; Ruth Minsky Sender; Sara Zyskind
- Notable books: S. Selver-Urbach, Through the Window of My Home; M. Moskin, I am Rosemarie; S. Zyskind, Stolen Years; R. M. Sender, The Cage; R. M. Sender, To Life
- Website: www.gross-rosen.eu/historia-kl-gross-rosen/filie-obozu-gross-rosen/ scinawka.republika.pl/historia.html

The Mittelsteine concentration camp was a Nazi Arbeitslager or slave-labour camp functional on the territory of Nazi Germany during the latter part of the Second World War, now at Ścinawka Średnia in south-western Poland.

It was originally established in 1942, but was operated formally for 250 days (8 months and a week) between 23 August 1944 and 30 April 1945 (the latter being the date of its liquidation) as an all-female subcamp of Gross-Rosen.

== Overview ==
=== Inmates and staff ===
The detainees at the camp included primarily women of Jewish background deported from Hungary and Poland. The number of inmates averaged at 300, or 400, while towards the end of the War the total swelled to nearly 1,000. The function of camp commandant or Lagerkommandant (a position sometimes denominated Zwischengeschalteter SS-Offizier or "SS liaison officer") was performed by SS-Hauptsturmführer Paul Radschun. The Oberaufseherin or "senior overseer" (the highest female official) was Erna Rinke. The staff included 10–15 female guards. Among the most notorious of them are mentioned the names of the Aufseherinnen Philomena Locker (sentenced after the War to seven years' imprisonment), Charlotte Neugebauer, and (first name unknown) Schneider.

=== Location ===
The camp was situated in the locality called Mittelsteine (renamed Ścinawka Średnia in 1947) in what was then the territory of the Third Reich, about 17 km (11 mi) to the north-west of Kłodzko (German: Glatz), the nearest larger town, or 104 km (65 mi) to the south-west of the regional metropolis, Wrocław (Breslau) — in the territory of Lower Silesia.

Despite its picturesque geographical location in the so-called Ścinawka Depression (Obniżenie Ścinawki) between the Table Mountains and the Stone Mountains and its history reaching back to the 14th century, Mittelsteine/Ścinawka Średnia was before the Second World War a highly industrialized village. The hamlet was, for example, the site of a major power plant that supplied electricity to the electrified Silesian grid (the Elektrischer Bahnbetrieb in Schlesien) of the German railway system (see picture below) considered one of the most valuable assets of the Reich. It was a major railway junction already in the 19th century. Mittelsteine was thus a natural choice for the location of various industries.

Today, the border crossing between the Czech Republic and Poland at Otovice–Tłumaczów is just 8.5 km (5.3 mi)away; while the nearest town in Germany, Zittau, is 179 km (111 mi) away.

=== The camp ===
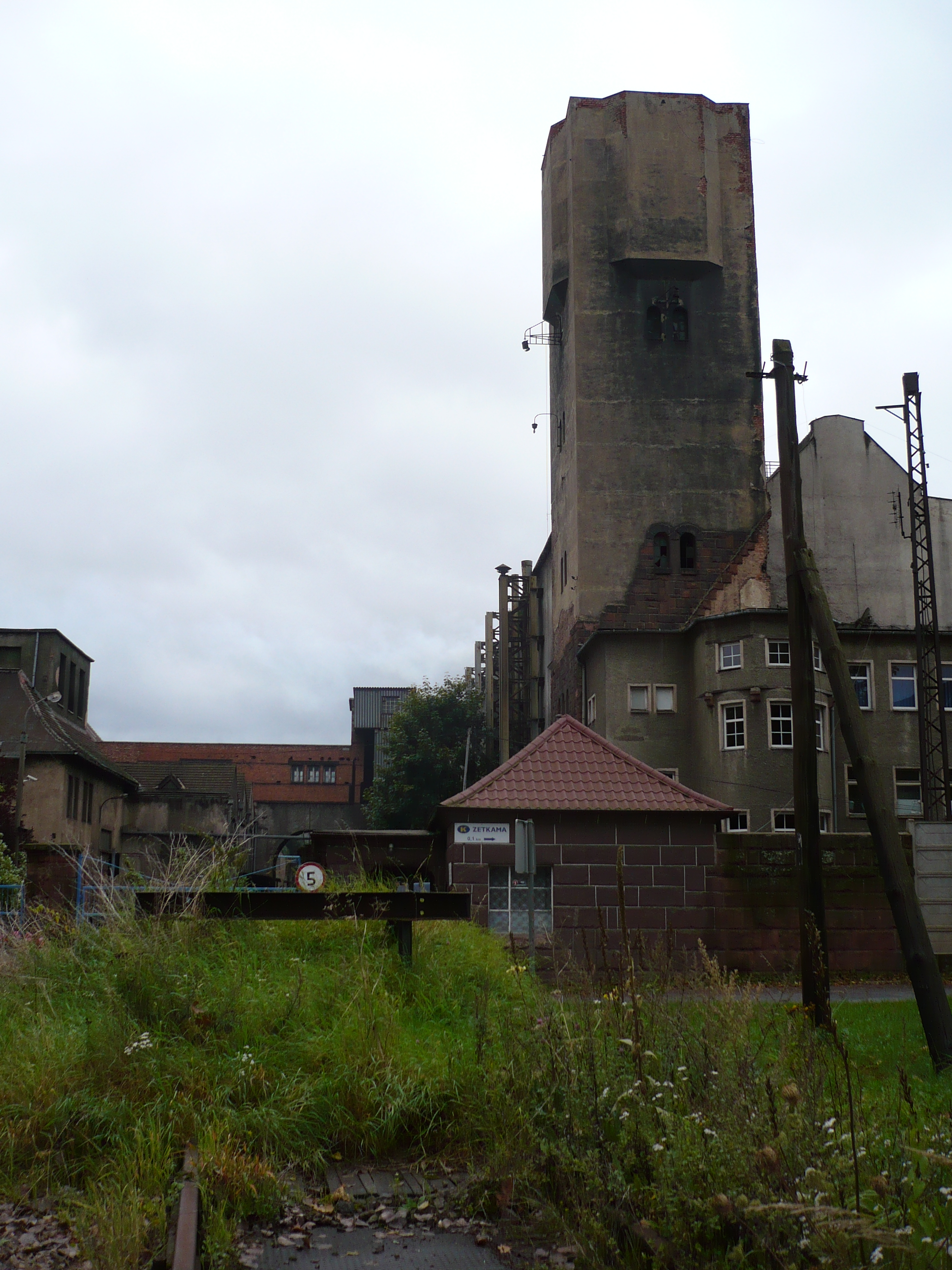
The Reichsbahnkraftwerk Mittelsteine, the German railways' power plant: one of the "landmarks" of the village c. 1.04 km (0.65 mi) from the camp as the crow flies

The camp consisted of three barracks located by the north-western side of the exit road leading out of the village towards Ratno Dolne (Ger., Niederrathen) — the present-day Voivodeship Route (or DW) DW 387 locally called the ulica Piłsudskiego — about 600 metres from the bridge on the River Steine (present-day Ścinawka) in the direction away from the village centre on the right-hand side. The prisoners were marched under armed guard back and forth along village streets between their places of forced labour and the camp. The forced labour involved primarily work for the armaments and munitions manufacturer Totex, a subsidiary of Metallwarenfabrik Spreewerk GmbH, itself owned by the Deutsche Industrie-Werke AG (DIWAG), and for other DIWAG munitions concerns located at Mittelsteine, and at the aviation-parts factory Fa. Albert Patin, Werkstätten für Fernsteuerungstechnik (whose location within the village is today uncertain). Contemporary German accounts suggest the Albert Patin factory was located within 15 minutes' walk of the railway station. The inmates' slave labour was specifically related to the manufacture of component parts of the V-1 and V-2 rockets — components which were being secretly produced in the factory installed in the converted cotton mill (die Baumwollspinnerei) of Schiminsky & Co. (The factory is said to have been connected by a tunnel with the Kłodzko Fortress where a similar factory manned by slave labour was in operation.)

Prisoners unable to work because of serious illness were removed from the camp to be executed off premises, as were those in advanced stages of pregnancy. In the latter stages of the camp's existence in 1945 a number of prisoners who fell ill were allowed to die without medical care in the camp's Revier or isolation ward.

With the defeat looming in the last months and weeks of the War the Nazis liquidated the camp and transferred the prisoners to two alternative slave-labour sites according to the following selection process: the Hungarian nationals were sent to the preexisting camp of Mährisch Weisswasser in Bílá Voda in the Sudetenland, while the Polish nationals were sent to the newly created camp at Grafenort in Germany (now Gorzanów in Poland) at a distance of 27 kilometres from Mittelsteine. As Bella Gutterman, the director of the International Institute for Holocaust Research, comments on these ultimate developments, by 1945 the decisions of the Nazis with regard to the Mittelsteine camp "followed no evident logic". However, the inexplicable dénouement may be linked to the fact that, with the advances of the Allied forces on the Eastern Front, the Nazis rapidly halted the secret production of the V-1 and V-2 rocket components at Mittelsteine, dismantled the specialized machinery used for the purpose and shipped it out of the region.

== Post-war developments and testimonials ==
=== The victims ===
Among the several memoirs published by former inmates during the post-War period, the most detailed description of the camp, according to experts, is that offered by Sara Selver-Urbach in her book Through the Window of My Home published in Israel in 1964. Selver-Urbach writes, in part,

...life in Mittelsteine was sheer hell, even if a lesser hell than elsewhere, and our portion of torments and suffering was undoubtedly an indivisible part of that total, comprehensive system I have labelled "A Different Planet"...

Another former inmate, Ruth Minsky Sender, who in her 1986 book The Cage vividly conveys the pervasive atmosphere of terror established at Mittelsteine by the random use of torture, speaks in the interviews of the suicides among the despairing inmates.

=== The perpetrators ===
However, the owner of the chief among the slave-labour enterprises at Mittelsteine, the industrialist and inventor Albert Patin, instead of being prosecuted for war crimes after the War had ended, was brought in 1945 — together with his family which followed in 1946 — to the United States (initially to New York City) and subsequently provided with housing at U.S. Government's expense at Wright Field (near Riverside, Ohio) in a bid to wrest Luftwaffe secrets out of him, even as a bidding war raged among the British and the French intelligence agencies as to who would make the most attractive offer to entice him to their side. These events took place at precisely the time when the Nuremberg Tribunal — of which the United States was one of the four constitutive powers — was defining in the strict sense as war crimes, in Article 6(b) of its 1945 Charter, violations of the laws and customs of war that included but were not limited to

ill-treatment or deportation to slave labour or for any other purpose of civilian population of or in occupied territory, murder or ill-treatment of prisoners...

== Current status ==
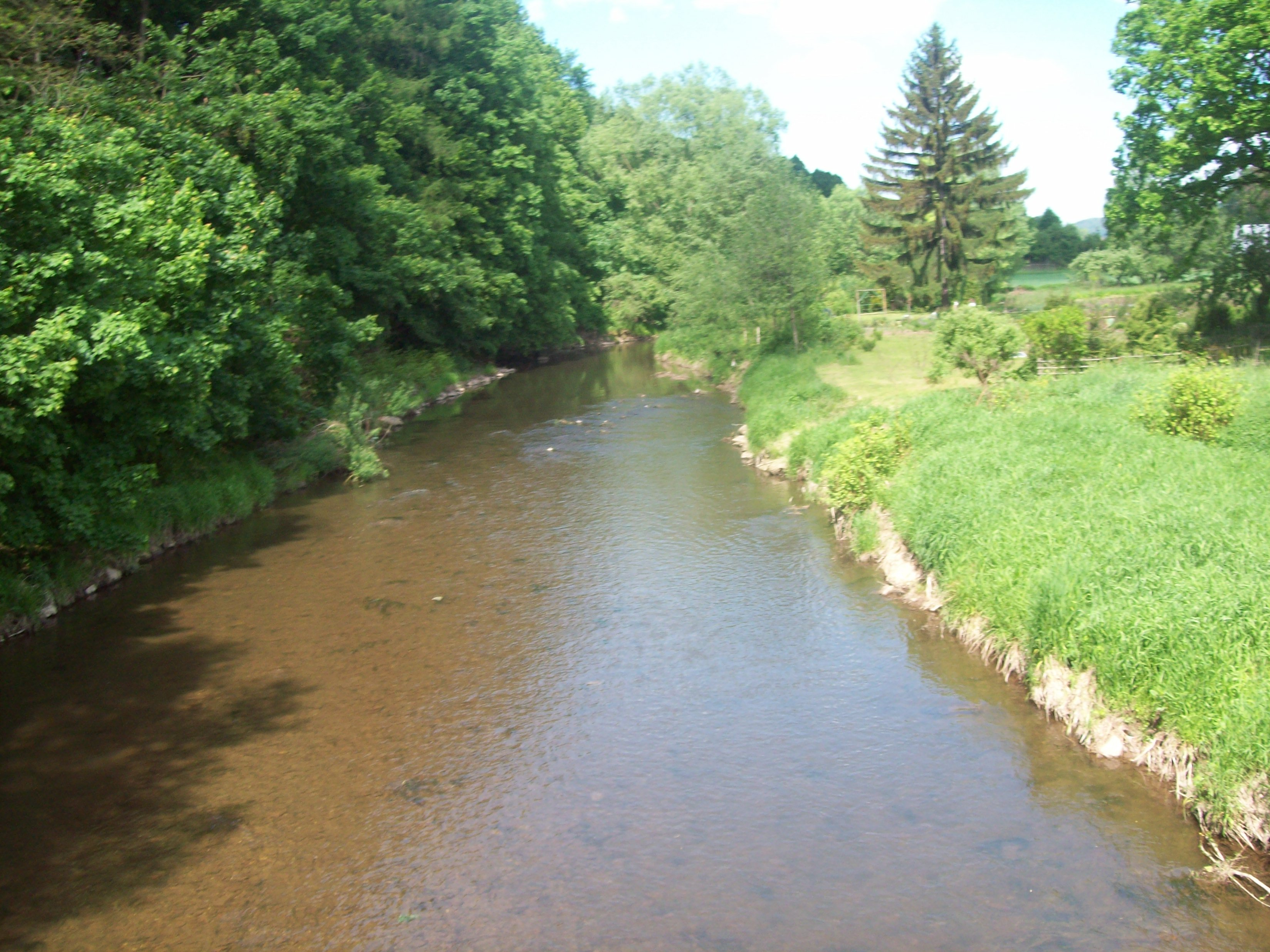
The River Ścinawka in Ścinawka Średnia (2007) river flowed c. 500 m from the camp as the crow flies

According to Polish press reports, the cotton mill that used to house the slave-labour factory, which until 1991 had been a running concern as a subsidiary of the (now defunct) state-owned Piast cotton mill (the Zakłady Przemysłu Bawełnianego "Piast") of Głuszyca, in 1992 became a private enterprise under the name of Raftom, and has since fallen victim to unscrupulous real-estate speculators and is being dismantled. There is no evidence of any official attempts to preserve or commemorate this major Holocaust site.

The Mittelsteine concentration camp has been formally recognized by the government of the Third Polish Republic as a place of martyrdom by the decree (rozporządzenie) of the Prime Minister of the Republic of Poland of 20 September 2001 promulgated in the official statute book, the Dziennik Ustaw (Dz.U.2001.106.1154), as a legal technicality resorted to for the purposes of including former Mittelsteine inmates within the category of persons eligible for special care and protection of the Polish State as veterans and/or victims of Nazi or Communist repressions — a class of persons previously established by the Veterans and Certain Victims of Repressions Act of 24 January 1991 (Dz.U.1997.142.950).

== Notable inmates ==
- Marietta Moskin, Vienna-born American children's book author (1928–2011)
- Sara Selver-Urbach, writer
- Ruth Minsky Sender, writer
- Sara Zyskind, writer
- Gita (Giselle) Cycowicz (née Friedman), psychologist

== Bibliography ==
- Obozy hitlerowskie na ziemiach polskich 1939–1945: informator encyklopedyczny, ed. Cz. Pilichowski, et al. (for the Główna Komisja Badania Zbrodni Hitlerowskich w Polsce and the Rada Ochrony Pomników Walki i Męczeństwa), Warsaw, Państwowe Wydawnictwo Naukowe, 1979, p. 509. ISBN 8301000651.
- Roman Mogilanski, comp. & ed., The Ghetto Anthology: A Comprehensive Chronicle of the Extermination of Jewry in Nazi Death Camps and Ghettos in Poland, rev. B. Grey, Los Angeles, American Congress of Jews from Poland and Survivors of Concentration Camps, 1985, page 246.
- Augustin Rösch, Kampf gegen den Nationalsozialismus, ed. R. Bleistein, Frankfurt am Main, Knecht, 1985, page 244. ISBN 3782005163.
- Encyclopedia of the Holocaust, ed. I. Gutman, vol. 4, New York, Macmillan Publishing Company, 1990, pages 625, 1862. ISBN 0028960904.
- Enzyklopädie des Holocaust: die Verfolgung und Ermordung der europäischen Juden, ed. E. Jäckel, et al., vol. 1, Berlin, Argon, 1993, page 571. ISBN 3870243007, ISBN 3870243015.
- Women in the Holocaust: A Collection of Testimonies, comp. & tr. J. Eibeshitz & A. Eilenberg-Eibeshitz, vol. 2, Brooklyn (New York), Remember, 1994, pages 67, 204–205. ISBN 0932351468, ISBN 0932351476.
- Benjamin and Vladka Meed Registry of Jewish Holocaust Survivors, vol. 2, Washington, D.C., United States Holocaust Memorial Council in cooperation with the American Gathering of Jewish Holocaust Survivors, 1996, pages 267–268. ISBN 0896041581.
- Studia nad Faszyzmem i Zbrodniami Hitlerowskimi, ed. K. Jonca, vol. 22 (2136), Wrocław, Wydawnictwo Uniwersytetu Wrocławskiego, 1999, page 375. ISBN 8322920474. ISSN 0239-6661, ISSN 0137-1126. (An extremely important source.)
- Jan Kosiński, Niemieckie obozy koncentracyjne i ich filie, ed. W. Sobczyk, Stephanskirchen near Rosenheim, Drukania Polska Kontrast, 1999. ISBN 300005152X.
- Edward Basałygo, 900 lat Jeleniej Góry: Tędy przeszła historia: Kalendarium wydarzeń w Kotlinie Jeleniogórskiej i jej okolicach, Jelenia Góra, 2010. (See online.)
- Andrzej Strzelecki, Deportacja Żydów z getta łódzkiego do KL Auschwitz i ich zagłada: opracowanie i wybór źródeł, ed. T. Świebocka, Oświęcim, Państwowe Muzeum Auschwitz-Birkenau, 2004. ISBN 8388526804.
- Filie obozu koncentracyjnego Gross-Rosen: informator, Wałbrzych, Muzeum Gross-Rosen, 2008, pp. 35, 51–54. ISBN 9788389824073.
- Bella Gutterman, A Narrow Bridge to Life: Jewish Forced Labor and Survival in the Gross-Rosen Camp System, 1940–1945, tr. IBRT, New York, Berghahn Books, 2008. ISBN 9781845452063, ISBN 1845452062.
- The United States Holocaust Memorial Museum Encyclopedia of Camps and Ghettos, 1933–1945, ed. Geoffrey P. Megargee, vol. 1 (Early Camps, Youth Camps, and Concentration Camps and Subcamps under the SS-Business Administration Main Office (WVHA)), Bloomington, Indiana, Indiana University Press, in association with the United States Holocaust Memorial Museum, 2009, pages xiii, 700, 757, 765–766, 1573, 1624. ISBN 9780253354297.

== See also ==
- Gross-Rosen concentration camp
- List of subcamps of Gross Rosen
- List of Nazi-German concentration camps
- History of children in the Holocaust
- Operation Paperclip
