= The Cage: A Holocaust Memoir =

1986 non-fiction book Ruth Minsky Sender

The Cage
- Author: Ruth Minsky Sender
- Language: English
- Published: 1986
- Publisher: Macmillan
- Publication place: Poland
- ISBN: 0-689-81321-X

The Cage: A Holocaust Memoir is a book written by Ruth Minsky Sender in 1986, is an account of her experience as a Jewish person during the Holocaust. It was published in 1986, by Macmillan.

The book begins in 1986. Riva, who later changed her name to Ruth, is speaking with her daughter, Nancy, and she looks back to Lodz, Poland in 1941.

== Synopsis ==
Thirteen-year-old Riva Minska, her mother, three brothers and landlord are living in the same house. Soon the Germans invade Poland. At this time, Riva and her family are betrayed by their landlady and robbed of their valuables and possessions. Soon, the gates of the Lodz Ghetto were shut and no one came in; they only went out. Throughout the book, Riva refers to all the places she has been confined as "the cage".

A couple of years later, chaos has spread rapidly through the ghetto. Riva's brother, Laibele, contracts tuberculosis. Her mother is taken away in a Nazi raid because she looked sick. A little while after her mother's deportation, a social worker tries to find homes for the children who now are without adult supervision. But adoption means the remains of her family will be separated. Riva protests and eventually becomes the sixteen-year-old legal guardian of her younger brothers, Laibele, Motele, and Moishele.

In the following years, Riva must fight sickness, deportation, and losing hope. In the midst of all of this, Laibele is consumed by his disease. Now Riva, Motele, and Moshiele must fight harder than ever to prevent being caught by the Nazis and deported. Eventually, the Nazi determines that Riva and her brothers should be deported to Auschwitz. Once Riva arrives at Auschwitz, she is separated from her family, and she spends only one week there. However, Riva is forced to undress, put her glasses in a gigantic pile and pushed into an open area. With many other women, she is blasted with cold water and Riva can never forget the screams of the young girls and women. She is then given old clothes that do not fit well. Upon dressing in the clothes, Riva is forced to follow the women of the camp as they are screamed at to stand up in areas where the commandants cut and shave all of their hair off their heads. This traumatizes Riva and she is not sure what to make of her life.

In part two, Riva is deported to Mittelsteine with her friend, Tola. When Riva arrives at Mittelsteine, she finds a pencil and she makes use of it by writing poetry. However, when the commandants find out about her poetry, she is scolded; later she ends up developing a severe case of blood poisoning. Eventually, the commandant actually gives Riva her poetry book back so that she can proceed with her writing.

As time continues to progress, Riva is deported to another concentration camp. She is eventually liberated, and she takes the time to go back to her hometown in Poland. Riva finds out that her childhood home is now owned by a Polish woman; therefore, she rents an apartment with some of her friends from the concentration camps. While in Poland, she also meets Moniek Sender who ends up becoming her husband. Riva also finds out that her siblings escaped and headed towards Russia.

Within the last part of The Cage, Riva reminisces about her horrible past while living in the concentration camps. She feels blessed that she is alive to tell her story, but she can never forget the terrible battles that she had to endure on a daily basis. She reiterates to her daughter that the past should never be forgotten because it tends to stay with a person even if most of the factors are considerably negative. With the many different time lapses that are seen within the book, the author vividly describes specific moments that have stuck out to her the most.

Ultimately, this personal account helps the reader to understand the many trials and tribulations that are faced by Riva. With a systematic breakdown of events, readers are able to determine factors regarding hope and courage even though there are many times when the author feels like giving up. Even through devastating occurrences take place, Riva is able to survive and develop as a result.
