= Ruth Minsky Sender =

Polish-born American writer and Holocaust survivor (1926–2024

- Born: Rifkele Riva Minska; 3 May 1926; Łódź, Poland
- Died: January 2024 (aged 97); Stony Brook, New York
- Occupations: Holocaust survivor, memoirist

Ruth Minsky Senderowicz (born Rifkele Riva Minska; 3 May 1926 – January 2024) was a Polish-American Holocaust survivor. She wrote three memoirs about her experience: The Cage, To Life and Holocaust Lady.

== Early life ==
Rifkele Riva Minska was born in Łódź, Poland to Avromele and Nacha Minska. Riva was born on May 3, 1926. She was the fourth of seven children: Chanele, Yankele, and Mala preceded her; brothers Motele, Moishele, and Laibele followed her. Riva's father, Avromele Minska died shortly after Moishele's birth.

== World War II ==
Before the invasion of Poland, Riva's older siblings fled to Russia to escape forced labor. Riva, her mom and younger siblings were forced to live in the Lodz Ghetto, where younger brother Laibele contracted tuberculosis. On September 10, 1942, their mother was taken out of the ghetto during a Nazi raid, leaving Riva to care for her younger brothers. She adopted them to keep the family together, which lasted until Laibele died and Riva, Motele, and Moishele were rounded up with the other remaining Jews in the ghetto and sent to Auschwitz. Riva and her brothers were separated at the gates.

After a week, Riva was transported to a labor camp in Mittelsteine. There she contracted blood poisoning from cutting her hand. However, she was spared death because she inspired others in the camp through her poetry. The SS officers agreed to take her to a German hospital for treatment. When she recovered, she was sent to the labor camp at Grafenort for the remainder of the war. The camp was liberated by Russian forces. Riva finally got her wish to be free. She moved to the United States of America and started a family.

== Post-war ==
After liberation, Ruth returned to Łódź with friends from the camp. They found that their former homes were occupied by people who had acquired the homes after the Jewish removal. Ruth and her friends decided to flee upon learning that Jewish survivors of the camps were targets for murder. They stayed in an abandoned apartment with other survivors.

The newlywed couple arranged to be taken to a displaced persons camp in Germany, where the couple gave birth to sons Laibele and Avromele. Also while at the camp, Ruth was reunited with her brother and sisters (Chanele, Yankele, and Mala) that escaped to Russia.

Afterward the family emigrated to the United States, where two more children, Chaim and Nachele (Nancy), were born. The family settled in Commack, New York and later Setauket, New York until her death in 2024. She occasionally spoke on her story; specifically at H.B. Mattlin Middle School, a large middle school in Plainview, New York, where her sister Chanele's children went to school. Her husband Morris died in 2005.

Sender died in January 2024, at the age of 97.

== Published works ==
- The Cage (Macmillan, 1986)
- To Life (Macmillan, 1988)
- The Holocaust Lady (Macmillan, 1999)
