= Ścinawka Średnia =

- Village
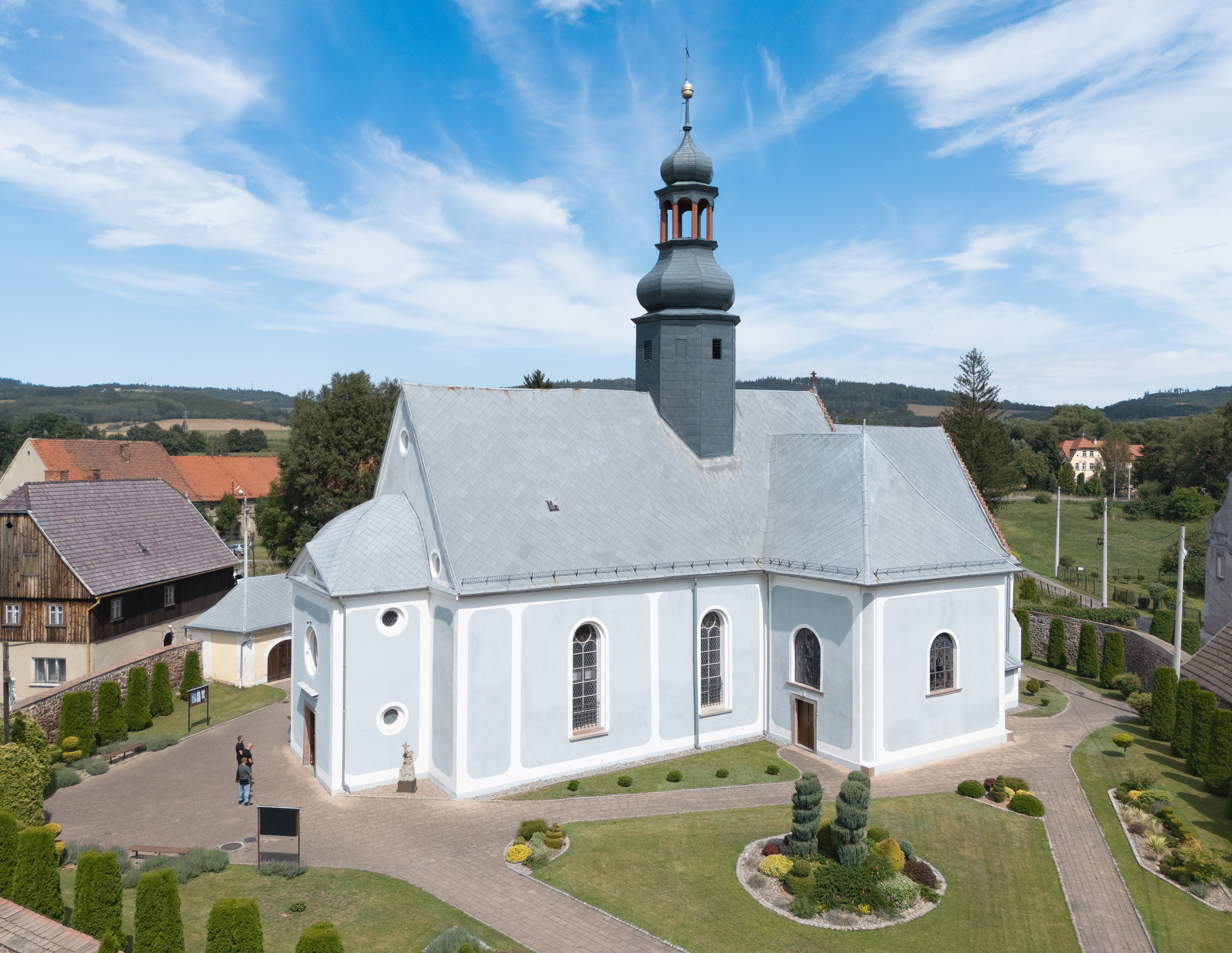
- Saint Mary Magdalene Church in Ścinawka Średnia

- Location within Poland
- Coordinates: 50°31′N 16°29′E
- Country: Poland
- Voivodeship: Lower Silesian
- County: Kłodzko
- Gmina: Radków

Population
  - Total: 2,400
- Time zone: UTC+1 (CET)
  - Summer (DST): UTC+2 (CEST)
- Vehicle registration: DKL

Ścinawka Średnia [ɕt͡ɕiˈnafka ˈɕrɛdɲa] is a village in the administrative district of Gmina Radków, within Kłodzko County, Lower Silesian Voivodeship, in south-western Poland.

== History ==
The history of the village dates back to the 13th century. In the Middle Ages at various times it was part of Poland or Bohemia. It was annexed by Prussia in the 18th century and from 1871 to 1945 it was also part of Germany. During World War II the Germans established and operated the Mittelsteine concentration camp, a subcamp of the Gross-Rosen concentration camp, whose prisoners were Jewish women deported from German-occupied Poland and Hungary.

The village was called Mittelsteine until 1945 when it was renamed "Skałeczno Średnie" after the region became again part of Poland. The name was changed to "Ścinawka Średnia" in 1947. The locality has historical associations with the life of the British philosopher Frederick Copleston (1907–1994) who spent time here in 1936 and who speaks warmly in his memoirs of the village's attractive natural surroundings suitable for unforgettable walks.

In 2018 the German power metal band Powerwolf filmed music video to song "Fire & Forgive" in Church of Saint Mary Magdalene. After publication of the video local curia released an official announcement about this situation.

== Sports ==
The local football club is Zjednoczeni Ścinawka Średnia. It competes in the lower leagues.

== See also ==
- Mittelsteine concentration camp
- History of Silesia
