= Gorzanów =

- Village
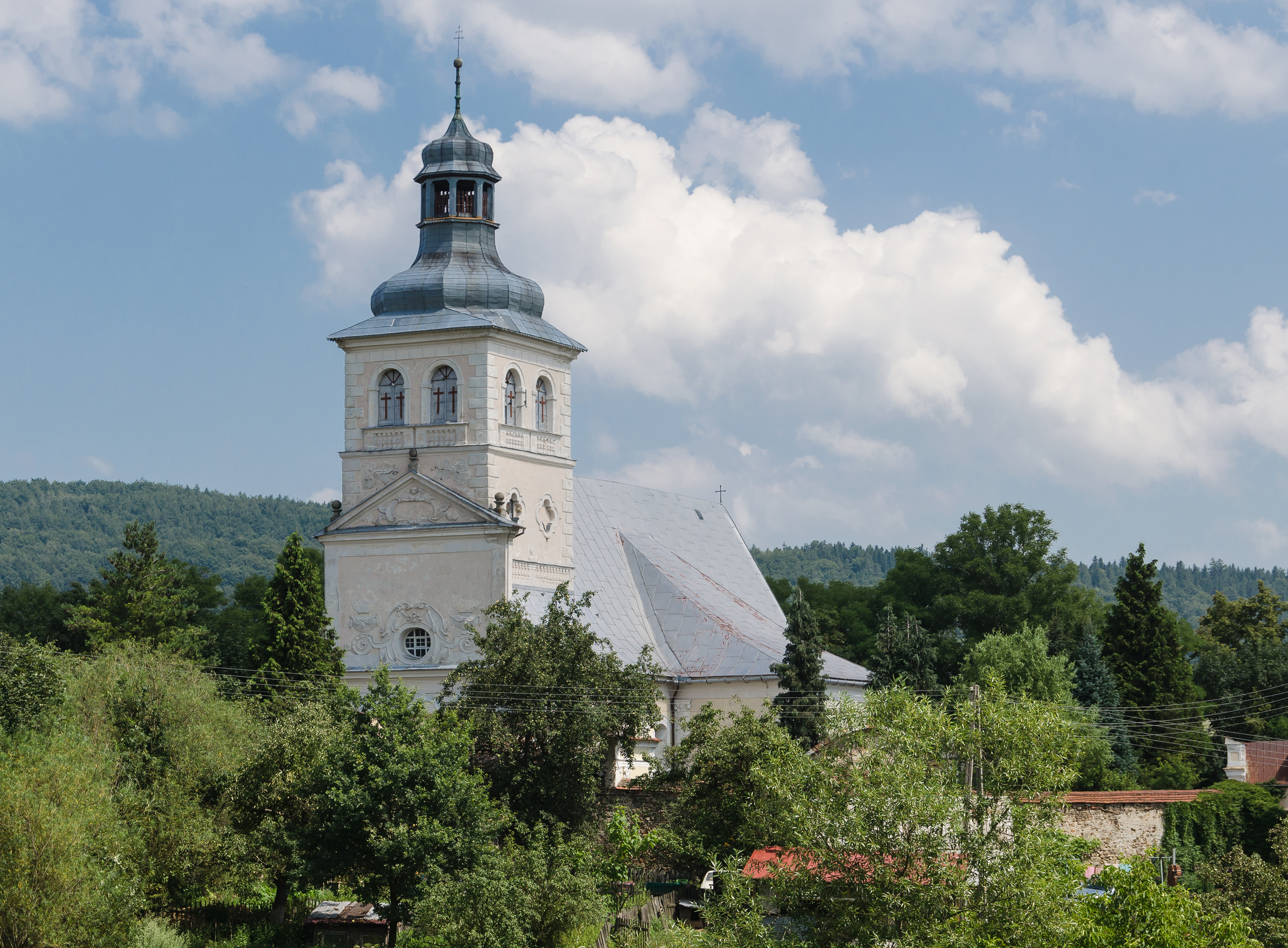
- Saint Mary Magdalene Church

- Location within Poland
- Coordinates: 50°21′07″N 16°37′56″E
- Country: Poland
- Voivodeship: Lower Silesian
- County: Kłodzko
- Gmina: Bystrzyca Kłodzka

Population
  - Total: 921
- Time zone: UTC+1 (CET)
  - Summer (DST): UTC+2 (CEST)
- Postal code: 57-521
- Vehicle registration: DKL

Gorzanów [ɡɔˈʐanuf] is a village in the administrative district of Gmina Bystrzyca Kłodzka, within Kłodzko County, Lower Silesian Voivodeship, in south-western Poland. There is a large Gorzanów Castle in the village.

== Name and history ==
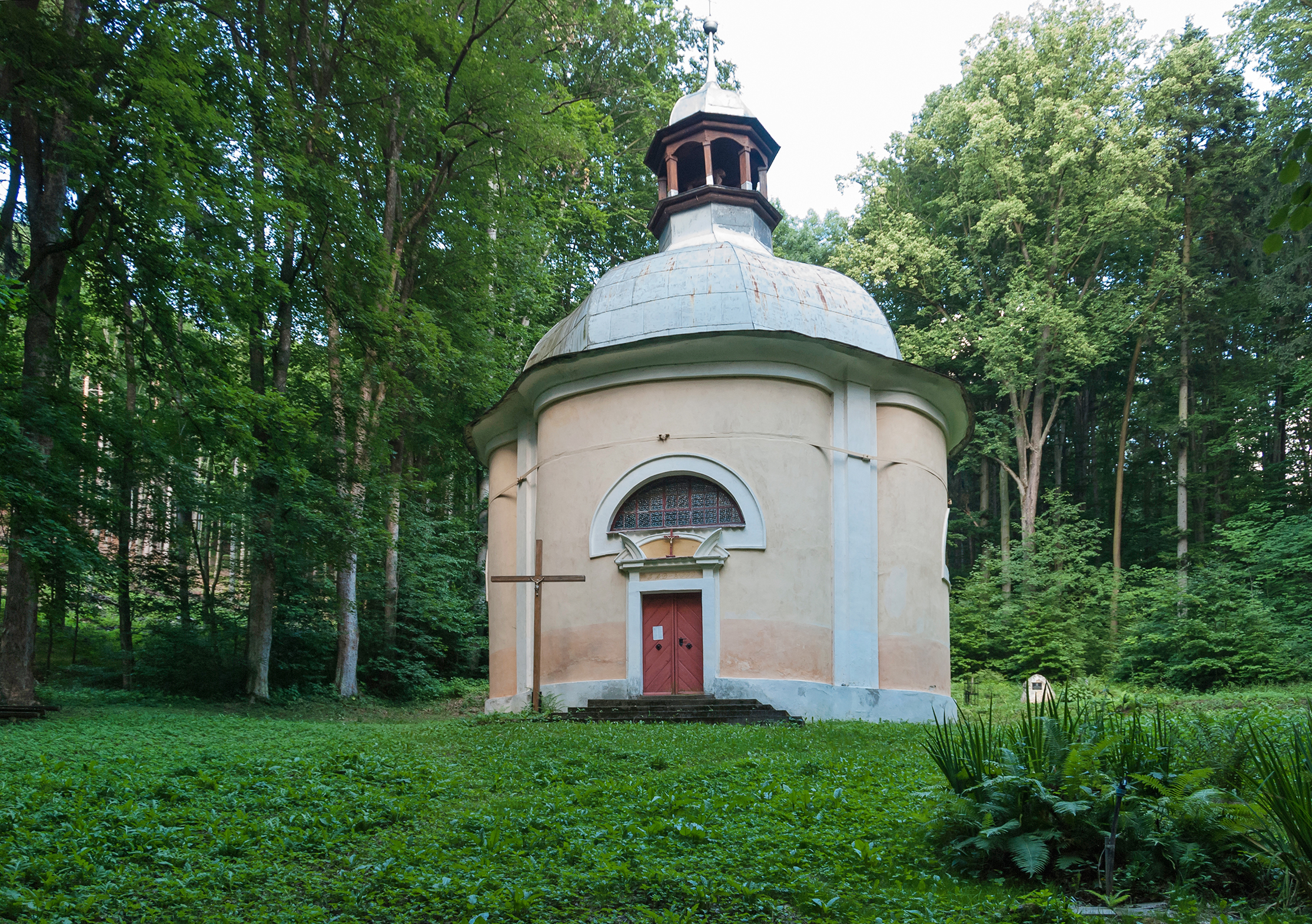
Saint Anthony chapel

The earliest name of the locality seems to have been the German appellation Arnoldsdorf (or Arnsdorf), derived from the personal name Arnold (+dorf), probably the name of the Lokator who brought German farmers to the village. The later German name of Grafenort derives from the noble title Graf (+ort, "locality"). In the seventeenth century the owner of the village was Johann Gundacker Graf von Heberstein. The name "Gorzanów" was introduced officially only after 1945. The name "Gorzanów" appears in the standard gazetteer of Polish place-names, the Słownik geograficzny Królestwa Polskiego (vol. 7, p. 239, col. 1), only with reference to a Polish village in the Podolia, a different geographical region. The village discussed in the present article is listed under the name Grafenort (Słownik geograficzny, vol. 2, p. 791, col. 1), without a corresponding Polish toponymic.

The history of the village dates back to the 12th century, when a defensive stronghold existed at the site. In the Middle Ages at various times it was part of Poland or Bohemia, itself part of the Holy Roman Empire. Probably in the 14th century a royal castle was built, which was destroyed in 1470, and the remains were dismantled around 1804. It was annexed by Prussia in the 18th century and from 1871 to 1945 it was part of unified Germany.

The Słownik geograficzny Królestwa Polskiego states that, historically, theatrical performances were staged at "the beautiful castle of the Hebersteins" three times a week for eight months of the year, and that the place was known for its "steam baths". The village had a Catholic church, and a chapel dedicated to St. Anthony surmounting a hill of the same name, which rises to the height of 1,053 feet above sea level. The location is described as "utterly exquisite" (prześliczne położenie).

During the Second World War the Nazis established a concentration camp on the premises of the palace, a satellite camp of Gross-Rosen concentration camp.

A present-day guidebook describes the "palace of Gorzanów" as being in a complete state of dilapidation, unfit to accommodate sightseers.

== Gallery ==
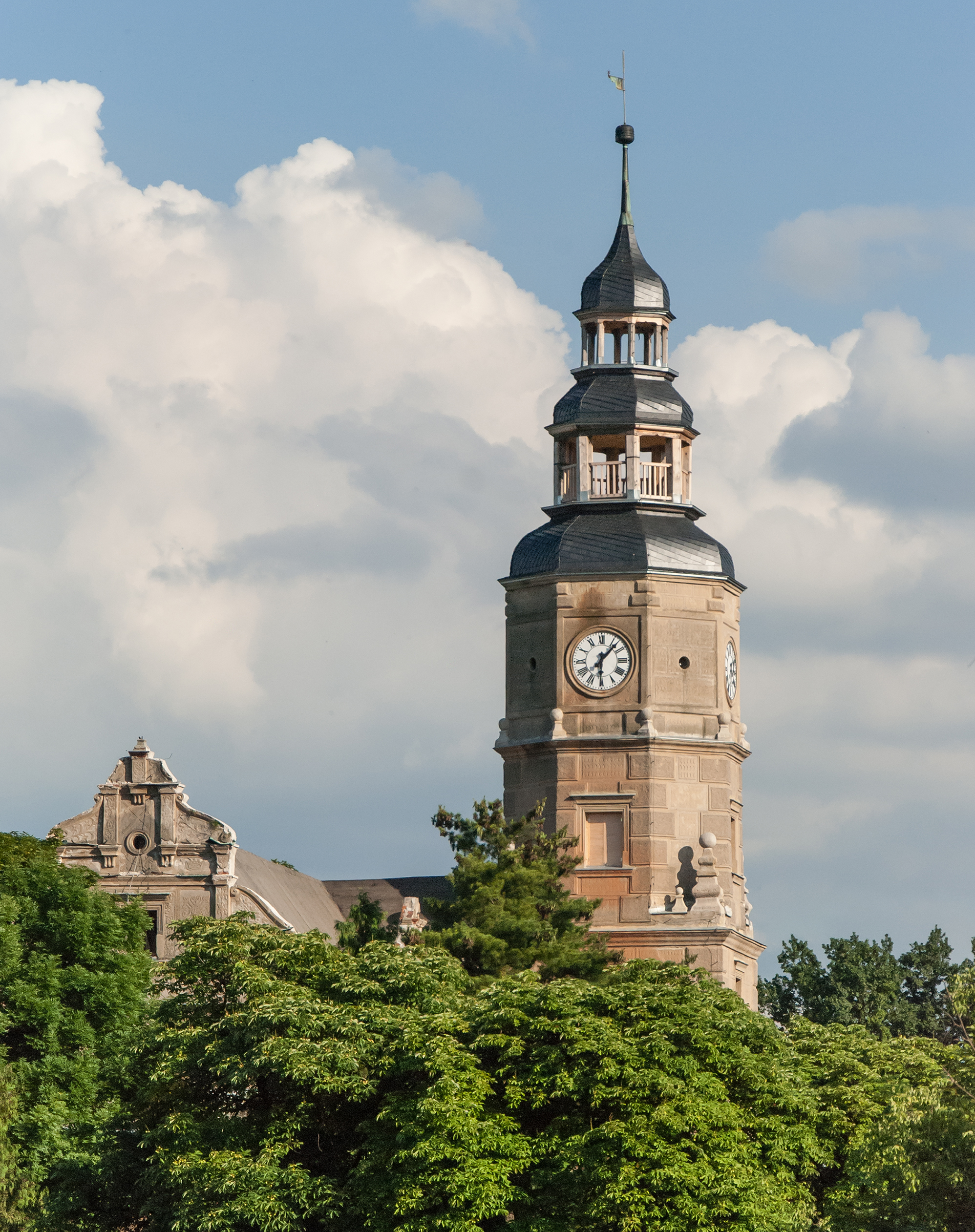
Castle

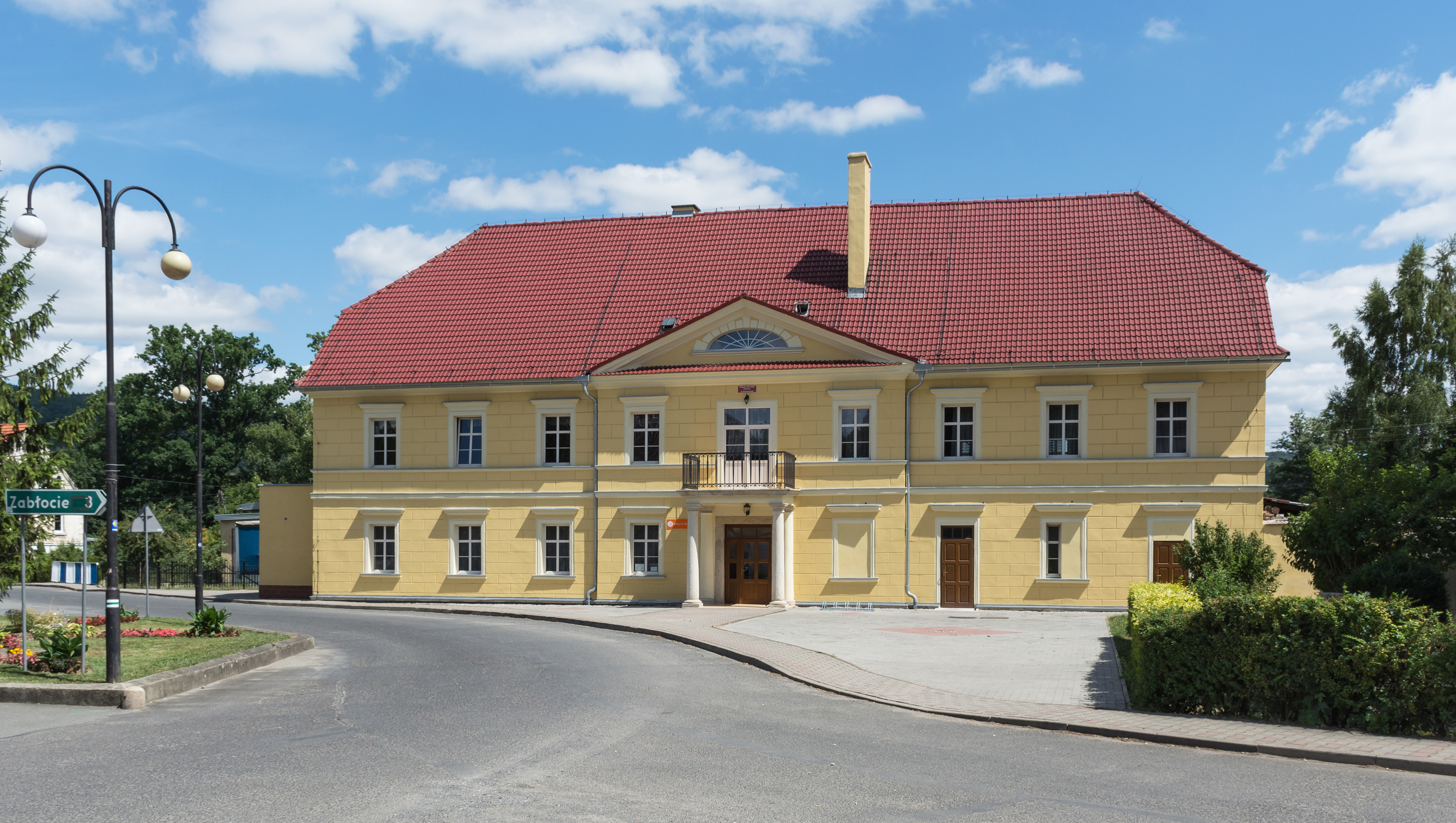
Culture centre

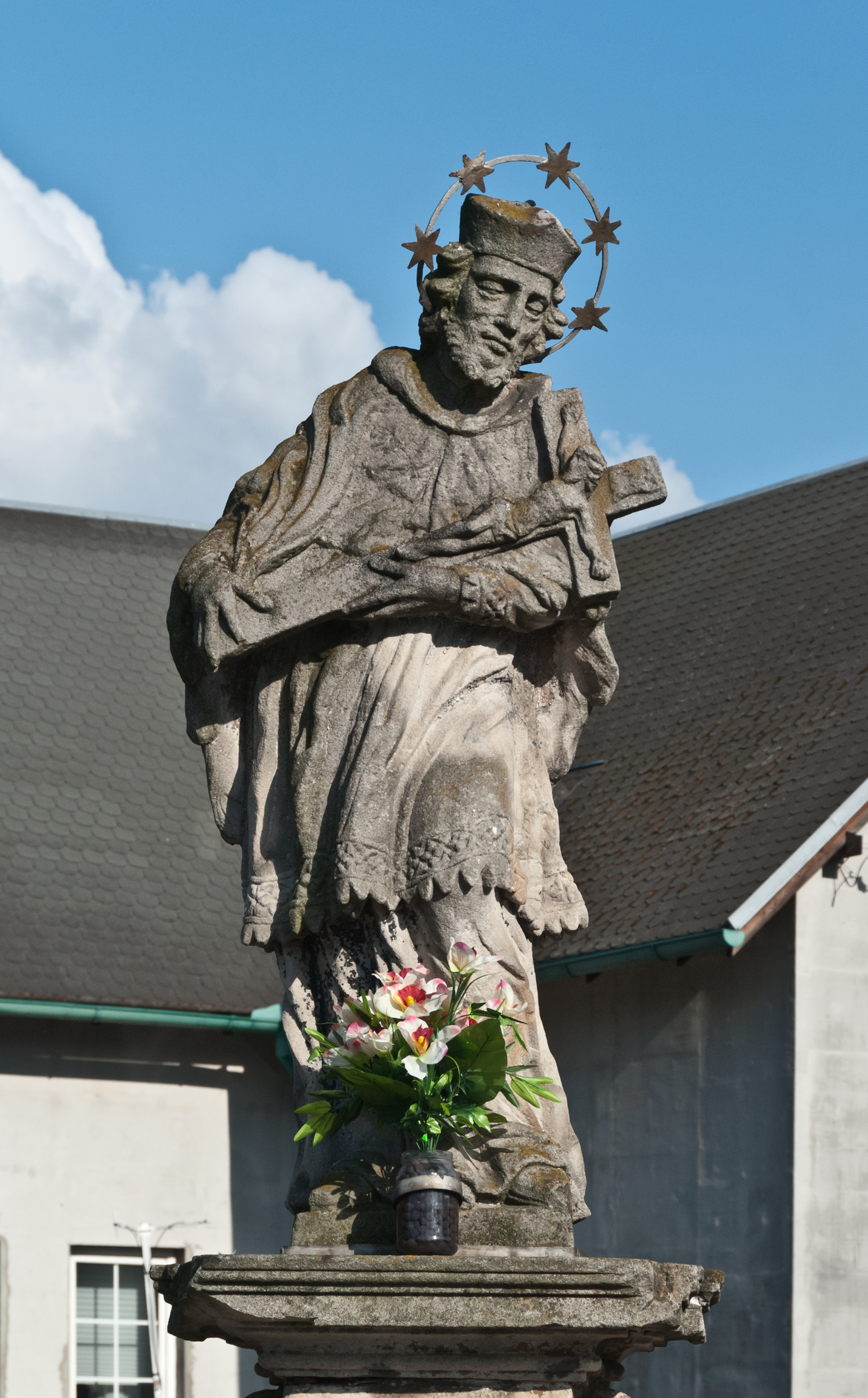
Statue of Saint John of Nepomuk

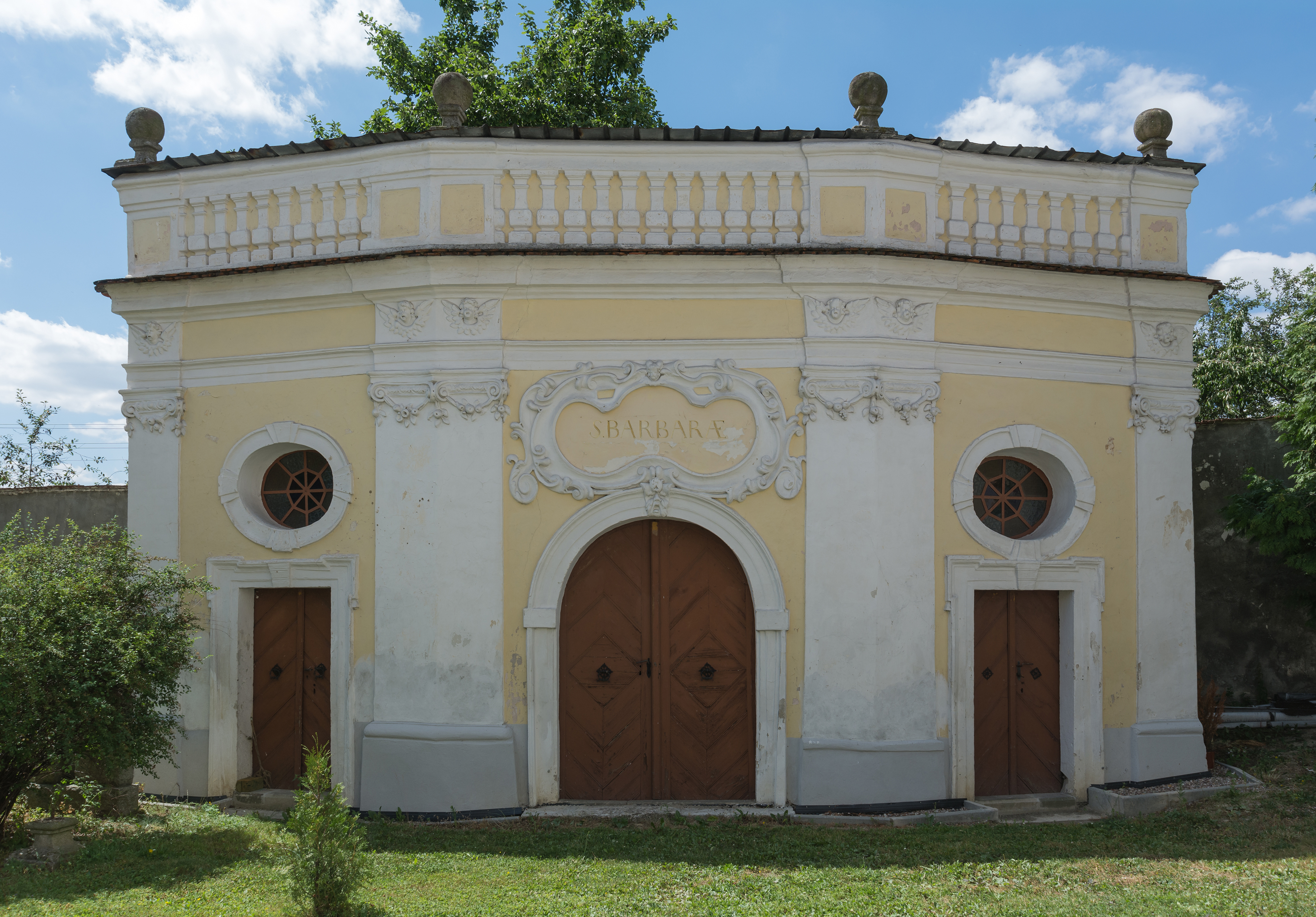
Saint Barbara chapel
