= Krucze Mountains =

Coordinates: 50.6578°N 15.9883°E

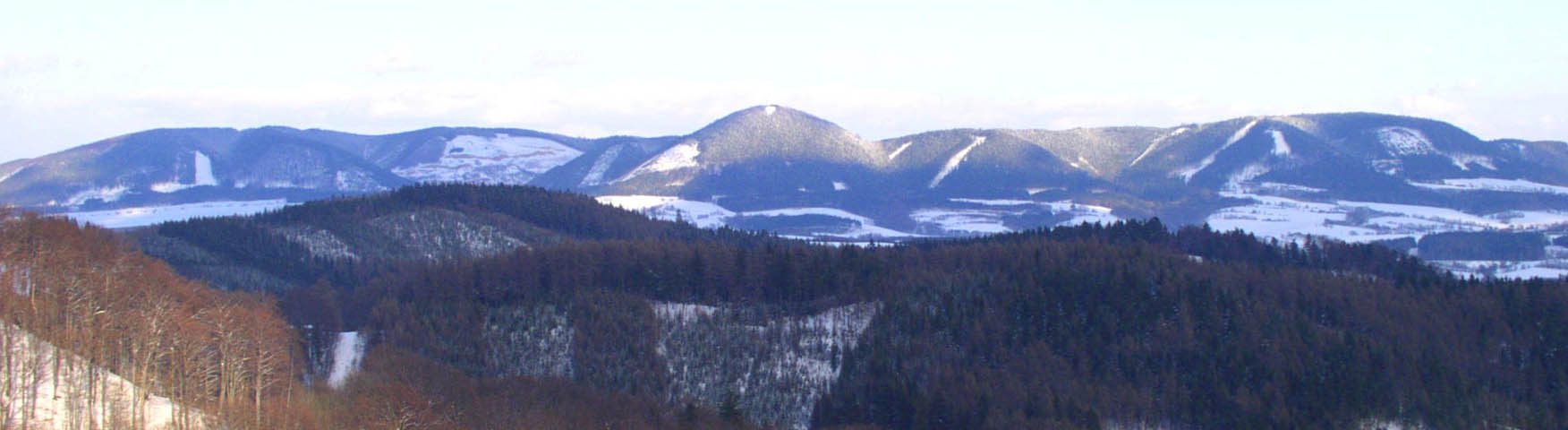

Highest point
- Peak: Královecký Špičák
- Elevation: 881 m (2,890 ft)

Geography
- Countries: Poland and Czech Republic

The Krucze Mountains (Czech: Vraní hory, Polish: Góry Krucze) are a mountain range and a geomorphological areas on the border of the Czech Republic and Poland, in the Central Sudetes. According to the Polish division, it is the eastern part of the Stone Mountains. According to the Czech division, the Czech part lies within the Žacléř Highlands in the eastern part of the Broumov Highlands. It borders the Stołowe Mountains. On the Czech–Polish border in the Krucze Mountains is a road border crossing in Královec/Lubawka and a pedesatrian border crossing in Okrzeszyn/Petříkovice.

== Specification ==
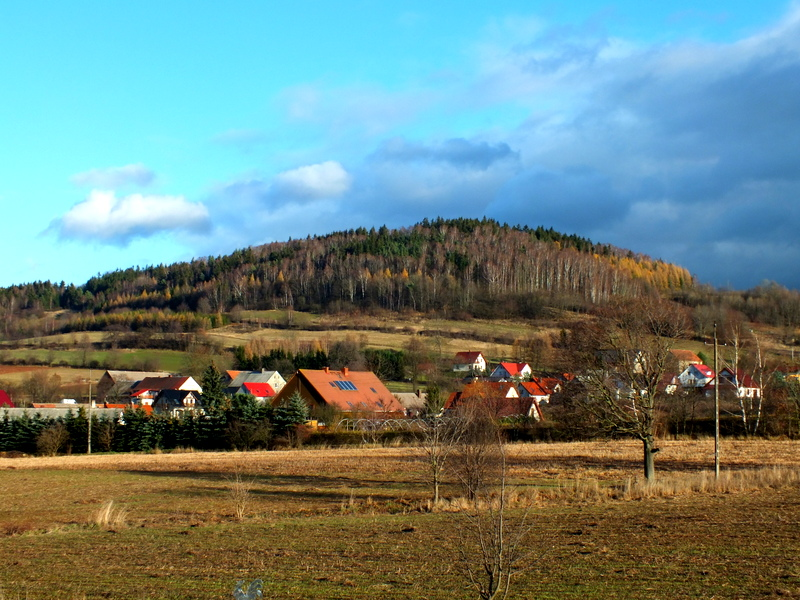
Długosz hill

The mountain range stretches from north to south, which is irregular for the Sudetes, this is due to their geological build. To the very North of the mountain range is Kościelna with a height of 513 metres, which is on the outskirts of the settlement of Kamienna Góra. The most important highest peaks in the northern part of the mountain range are: Długosz at 612 metres, Anielska Góra at 651 metres, Czarnogóra at 621 metres, Kierz at 662 metres, Skowroniec at 581 metres, Pustelnia at 683 metres, Święta Góra at 701 metres, Krucza Skała at 681 metres, Polska Góra at 792 metres, Szeroka at 844 metres, Głazica at 798 metres, Wiązowa at 800 metres, Jaworowa at 786 metres, Owcza Głowa at 753 metres, Końska at 813 metres, Kobyla Góra at 758 metres, Bogoria at 645 metres, Jański Wierch at 697 metres. On the Czech side of the mountain range, from the west of the border ridge is Královecký Špičák, the highest peak of the Krucze Mountains and Mravenčí vrch at 836 metres.

The Jańskiego Wierchu Massif is separated from the Krucze Mountains by the Szkła Valley, and according to Czech geographers the Jestřebí hory mountain range.

== Settlements ==
- On the Polish side of the mountain range: Błażejów, Błażkowa, Janiszów, Kamienna Góra, Lipienica, Lubawka, Okrzeszyn, Przedwojów and Uniemyśl.
- On the Czech side of the mountain range: Bernartice, Královec.
