= Zadrna =

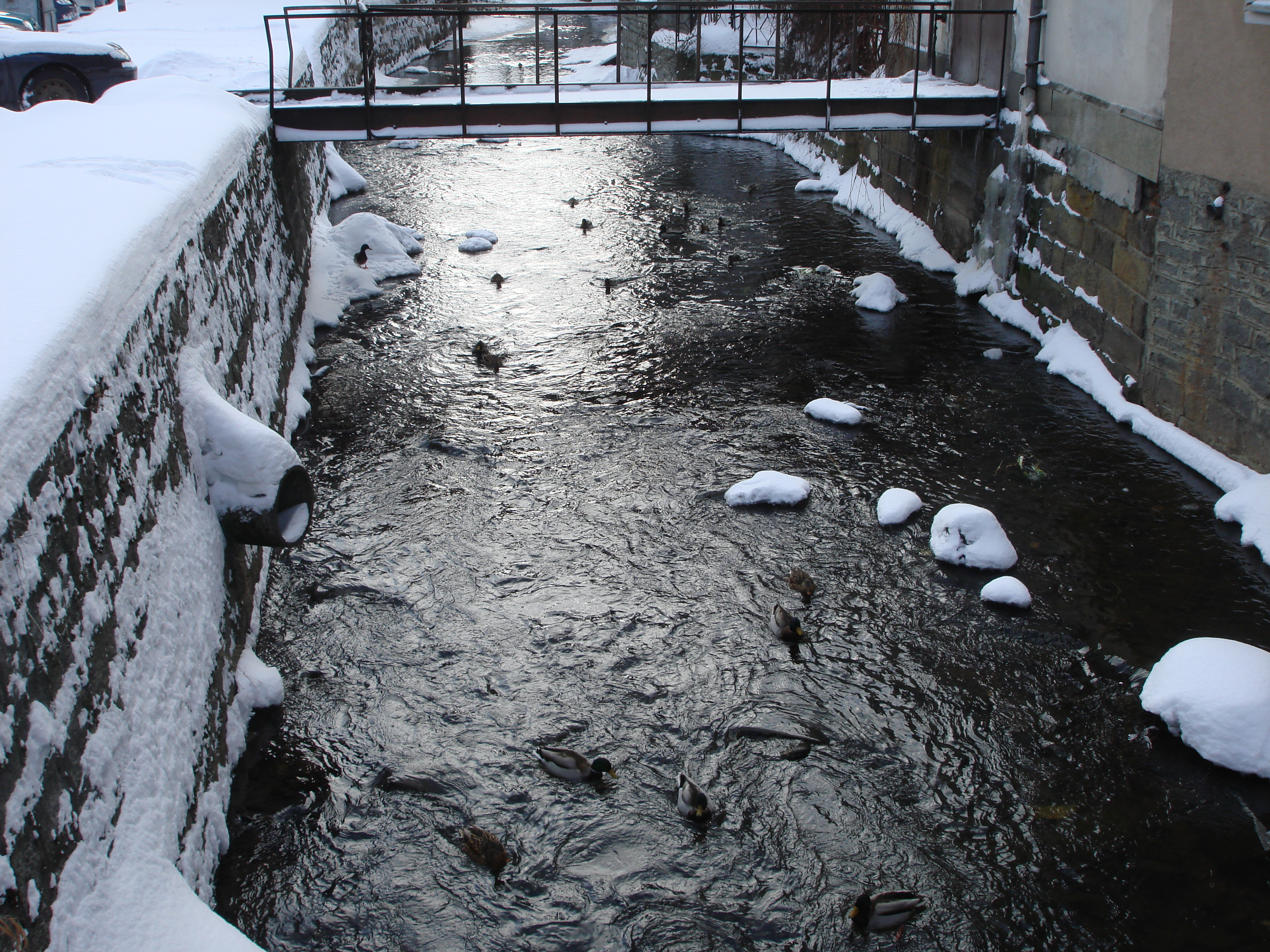
- Zadrna River in Kamienna Góra

Location
- Country: Poland

Physical characteristics
- Source
  - location: Góry Krucze near Błażejów
  - coordinates: 50°39′40.5″N 16°1′44.1″E
  - elevation: 600 m (2,000 ft)
- Mouth
  - location: Bóbr in Kamienna Góra
  - coordinates: 50°47′12″N 16°2′21″E
  - elevation: 440 m (1,440 ft)
- Length: 16 km (9.9 mi)
- Basin size: 112 km^{2} (43 sq mi)

Basin features
- Progression: Bóbr→ Oder→ Baltic Sea

Zadrna (German: Zieder) is a river in Lower Silesian Voivodeship in southwestern Poland, a right tributary of the Bóbr. It rises in the Góry Krucze range of the Central Sudetes near the village of Błażejów, close to the border with the Czech Republic.
