= Okrzeszyn =

Okrzeszyn may refer to the following places in Poland:

- Okrzeszyn, Lower Silesian Voivodeship (south-west Poland)
- Okrzeszyn, Masovian Voivodeship (east-central Poland)
