= Stone Mountains =

Mountain range in Poland and the Czech Republic

Coordinates: 50°41′00″N 16°17′00″E

Stone Mountains / Góry Kamienne
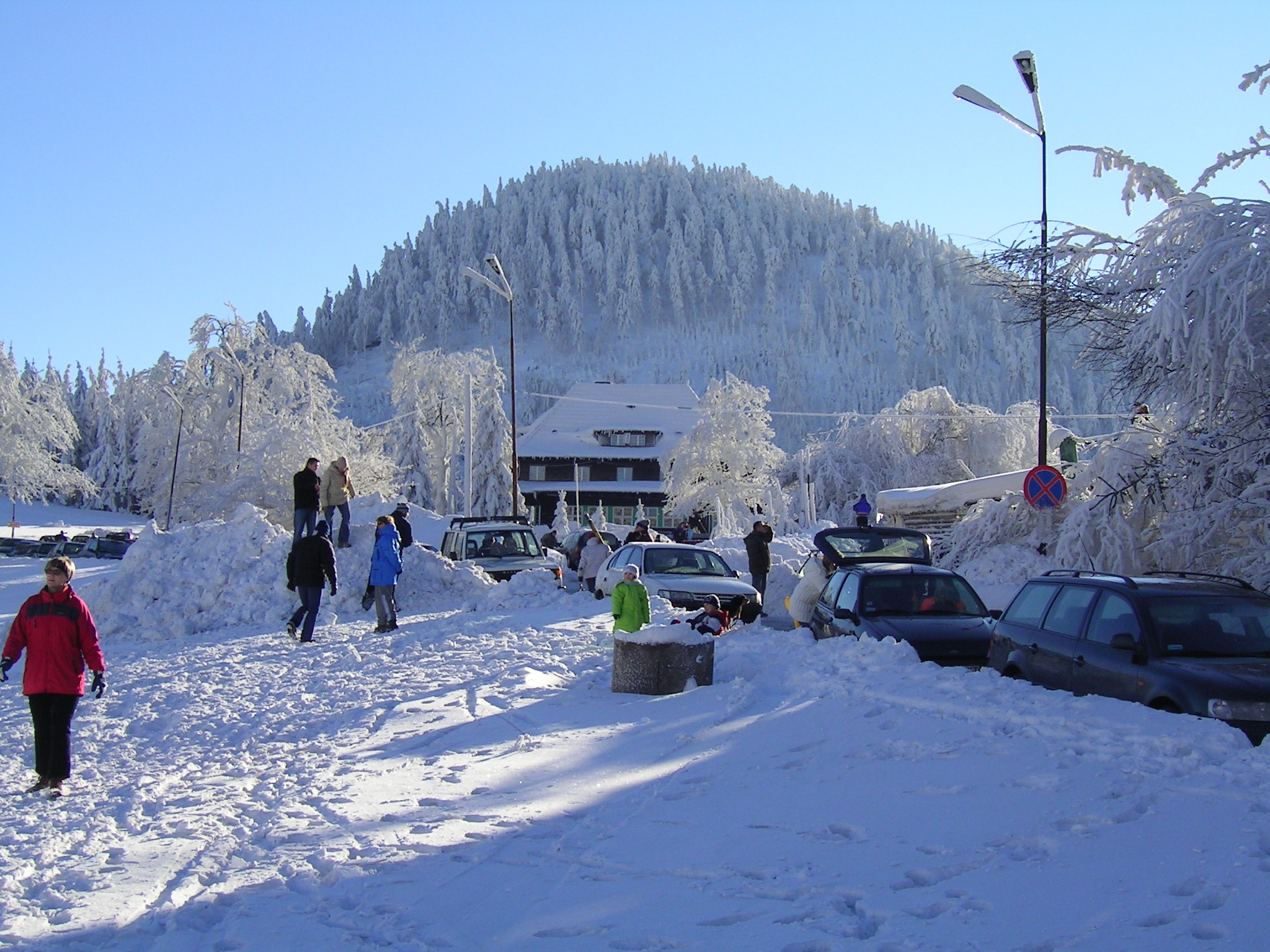
- Waligóra, the highest peak of the range

Highest point
- Peak: Waligóra
- Elevation: 936 m (3,071 ft)

Geography
- Countries: Poland, Czech Republic
- Voivodeship: Lower Silesian
- Parent range: Central Sudetes

The Stone Mountains (Polish: Góry Kamienne; Czech: Javoří hory) are a mountain range in the Central Sudetes, lying mainly in south-western Poland and partly extending into the Czech Republic. The highest summit is Waligóra (936 m). The Krucze Mountains form the eastern part of the range.

== Geography ==
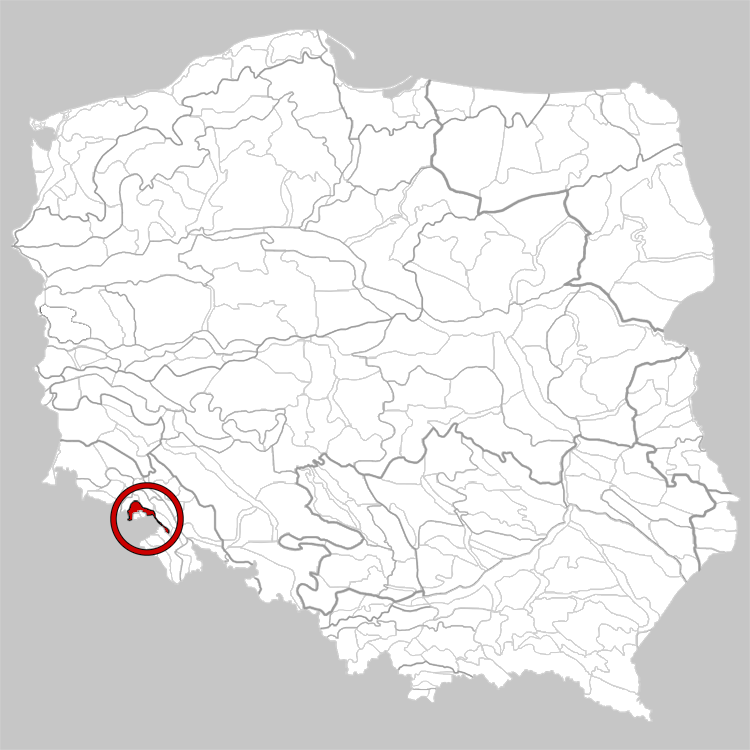
Location in Poland

The Stone Mountains are surrounded by the following mountain ranges and regions: to the northeast, the Wałbrzych Mountains; to the east, the Włodzickie Hills; to the south, the Nowa Ruda Depression and the Stołowe Mountains; and to the west, the Broumov Highlands.

The Stone Mountains extend south of Wałbrzych and along the Polish–Czech border. Their relief is among the most rugged in the Central Sudetes, with steep slopes, narrow valleys and sharply defined ridges.

The Krucze Mountains form the eastern part of the Stone Mountains and are therefore part of the range rather than a separate mountain system.

== Nature ==
The central and highest part of the range is protected within the Sudety Wałbrzyskie Landscape Park, which includes Pasmo Lesistej and the western part of the Suche Mountains with Waligóra.

== History ==
During World War II, Nazi Germany operated subcamps of the Gross-Rosen concentration camp in Bernartice, Meziměstí, Kamienna Góra, Lubawka and Mieroszów, in which over 3,500 people were held as forced labour.
