= Hieronim Jańczyk =

Polish politician (1924–2013)

Member of the Sejm of Poland
- In office 23 June 1973 – 19 March 1976

Personal details
- Born: 1 March 1924 Warsaw, Poland
- Died: 5 April 2013 (aged 89)
- Resting place: Kamienna Góra, Poland
- Party: Polish United Workers' Party
- Occupation: Politician; Machinist; Foreman

Hieronim Jańczyk (Polish: [xjɛˈrɔ.ɲim ˈjaɲ.t͡ʂɘ̟k]; 1 March 1924 – 5 April 2013) was a Polish politician and mechanist technician, who, from 1973 to 1976, was a member of the Sejm of Poland.

== Biography ==
Hieronim Jańczyk was born on 1 March 1924 in Warsaw, Poland. During the Second World War, he was sent to Germany as a forced labourer. After the end of the conflict, he returned to Poland, and begun working in the Textile Factory Complex in Kamienna Góra. There, he also graduated from the company vocational school. He worked as a locksmith, and later as a machinist and a traffic management foreman. In 1957, he became a councilor in the town of Kamienna Góra, and later, also a member of the council's presidium. In 1965, he graduated from a local mechanics vocational school, and became the second secretary of the Factory Committee of the Polish United Workers' Party. From 23 June 1973 to 19 March 1976, he was a member of the Sejm of Poland, replacing late Wiesław Ociepka, and representing the constituency of Wałbrzych. There, he was a member of the Commission of the Light Industry. Jańczyk died on 5 April 2013, at the age of 89. He was buried with his wife at a cemetery in Kamienna Góra.

== Awards and decorations ==
- Silver Cross of Merit
- Medal of the 10th Anniversary of People's Poland
- Badge of Merit for Upper Silesia
