= Chvaleč =

- Municipality
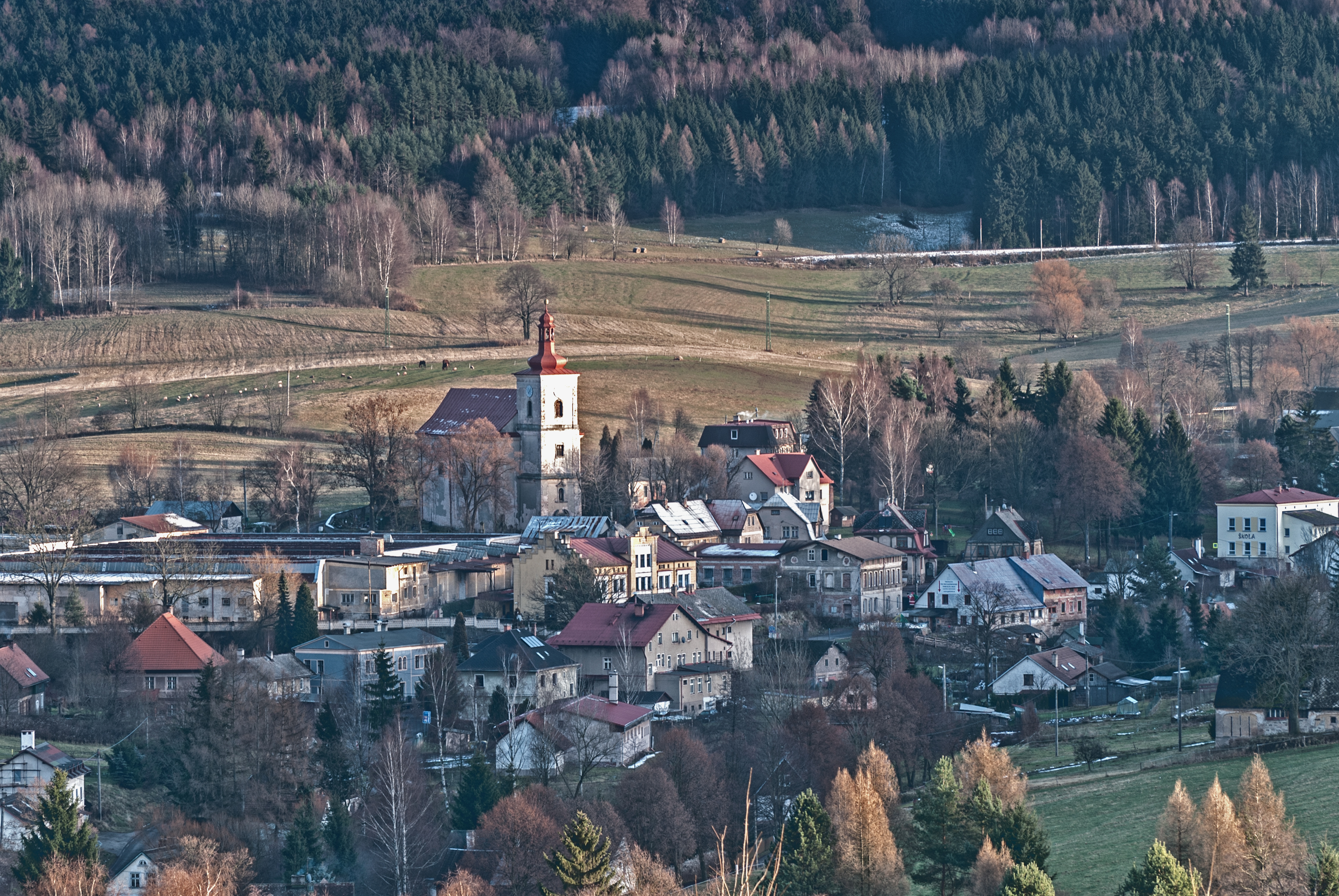
- General view of Chvaleč

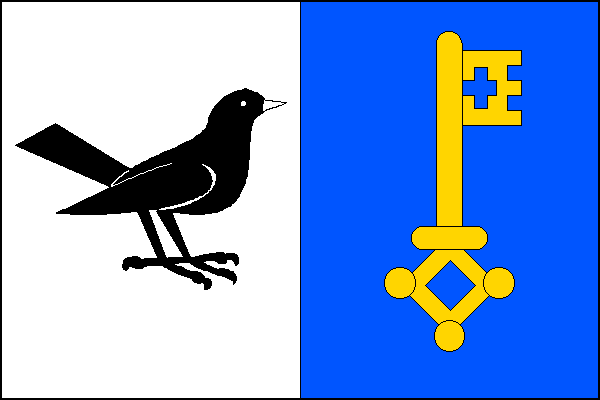
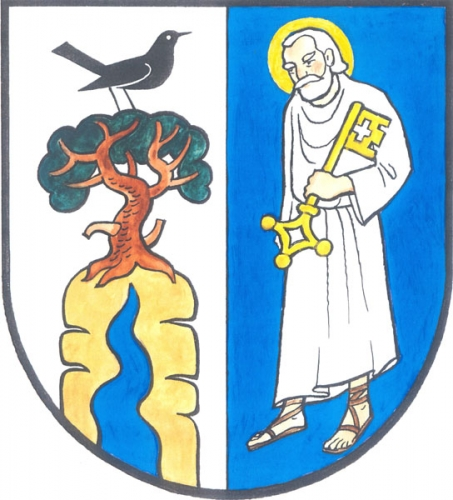
- Flag Coat of arms

- Location in the Czech Republic
- Coordinates: 50°35′45″N 16°2′22″E
- Country: Czech Republic
- Region: Hradec Králové
- District: Trutnov
- First mentioned: 1329

Area
  - Total: 17.22 km^{2} (6.65 sq mi)
- Elevation: 493 m (1,617 ft)

Population (2026-01-01)
  - Total: 629
  - Density: 36.5/km^{2} (94.6/sq mi)
- Time zone: UTC+1 (CET)
  - Summer (DST): UTC+2 (CEST)
- Postal codes: 541 01, 542 11
- Website: www.chvalec.cz

Chvaleč (German: Qualisch) is a municipality and village in Trutnov District in the Hradec Králové Region of the Czech Republic. It has about 600 inhabitants. It is located on the border with Poland.

== Administrative division ==
Chvaleč consists of two municipal parts (in brackets population according to the 2021 census):

- Chvaleč (479)
- Petříkovice (159)

== Demographics ==
Historical population
Year	Pop.	±%
1869	2,019	—
1880	1,852	−8.3%
1890	1,710	−7.7%
1900	1,634	−4.4%
1910	1,614	−1.2%
1921	1,644	+1.9%
1930	1,600	−2.7%
1950	742	−53.6%
1961	835	+12.5%
1970	755	−9.6%
1980	695	−7.9%
1991	603	−13.2%
2001	583	−3.3%
2011	627	+7.5%
2021	638	+1.8%
Source: Censuses
