= Bernartice (Trutnov District) =

Municipality in the Czech Republic

- Municipality
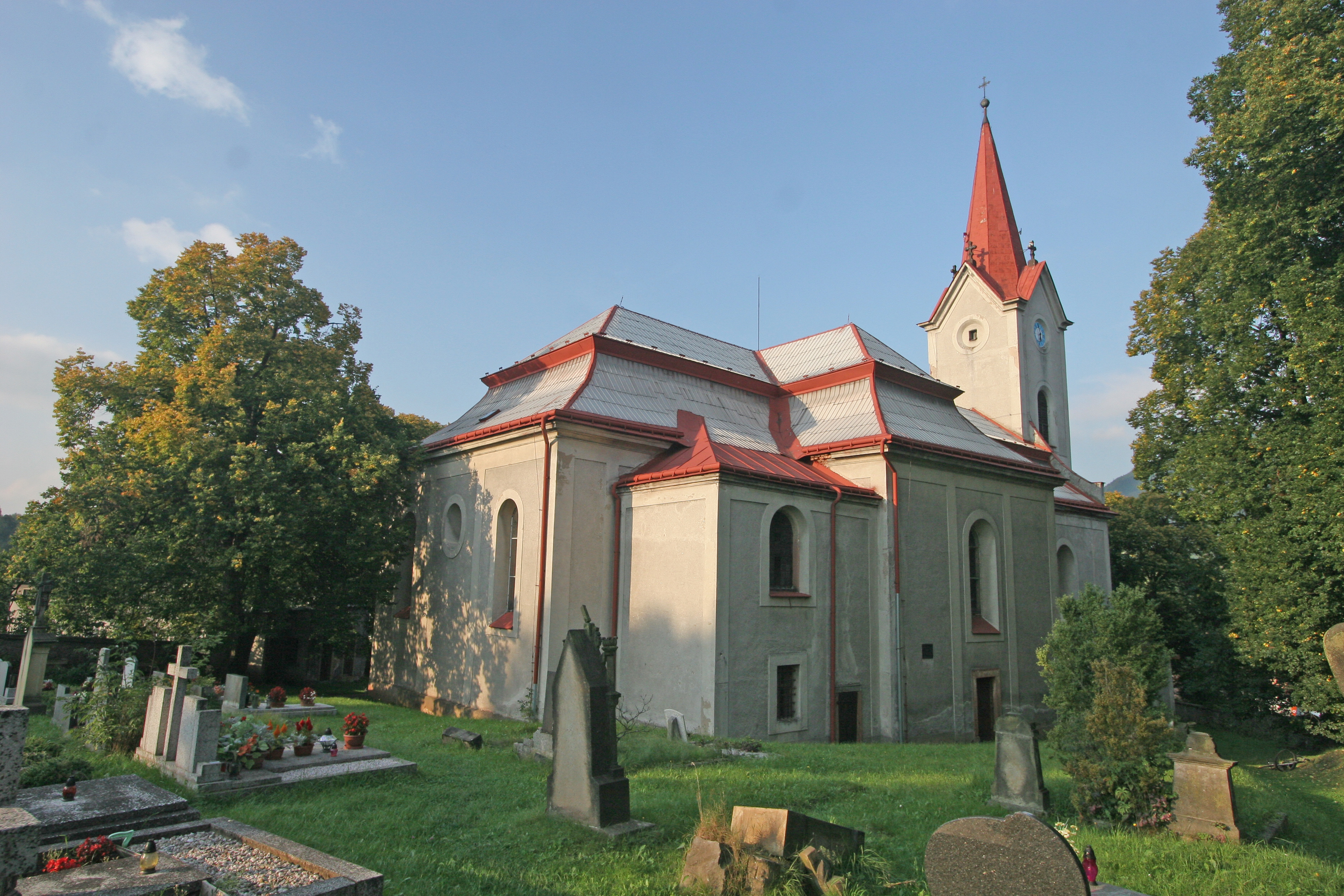
- Church of the Assumption of the Virgin Mary

- Flag Coat of arms

- Location in the Czech Republic
- Coordinates: 50°38′41″N 15°57′57″E
- Country: Czech Republic
- Region: Hradec Králové
- District: Trutnov
- First mentioned: 1297

Area
  - Total: 17.93 km^{2} (6.92 sq mi)
- Elevation: 579 m (1,900 ft)

Population (2026-01-01)
  - Total: 902
  - Density: 50.3/km^{2} (130/sq mi)
- Time zone: UTC+1 (CET)
  - Summer (DST): UTC+2 (CEST)
- Postal code: 542 04
- Website: www.obecbernartice.cz

Bernartice (German: Bernsdorf) is a municipality and village in Trutnov District in the Hradec Králové Region of the Czech Republic. It has about 900 inhabitants.

== Administrative division ==
Bernartice consists of two municipal parts (in brackets population according to the 2021 census):

- Bernartice (806)
- Křenov (61)

== Etymology ==
The name Bernartice is derived from the personal name Bernart (a variant of Bernard), meaning "the village of Bernart's people".

== Geography ==
Bernartice is located about 9 kilometres (6 mi) northeast of Trutnov and 48 km (30 mi) north of Hradec Králové, on the border with Poland. It lies in the Broumov Highlands. The highest point is the hill Mravenčí vrch at 837 m (2,746 ft) above sea level. The Ličná Stream flows through the municipality.

== History ==
The first written mention of Bernartice is from 1297. It was founded during the colonisation during the reign of King Ottokar II of Bohemia, probably around 1260.

During World War II, the German occupiers operated a subcamp of the Gross-Rosen concentration camp in the village in which over 400 Jewish women deported from various countries were subjected to forced labour. The camp was liberated in May 1945.

== Demographics ==
Historical population

Year	Pop.	±%
1869	2,782	—
1880	2,774	−0.3%
1890	2,885	+4.0%
1900	2,947	+2.1%
1910	2,805	−4.8%

Year	Pop.	±%
1921	2,466	−12.1%
1930	2,426	−1.6%
1950	1,322	−45.5%
1961	1,215	−8.1%
1970	1,143	−5.9%

Year	Pop.	±%
1980	982	−14.1%
1991	888	−9.6%
2001	899	+1.2%
2011	896	−0.3%
2021	867	−3.2%

Source: Censuses

== Transport ==
The I/16 road (the section from Trutnov to the Czech–Polish border in Královec) runs through the municipality.

Bernartice is located on the railway line Trutnov–Sędzisław.

== Sights ==
The main landmark of Bernartice is the Church of the Assumption of the Virgin Mary. It was built in the Baroque style in 1677–1678.
