= Błażejów =

- Village
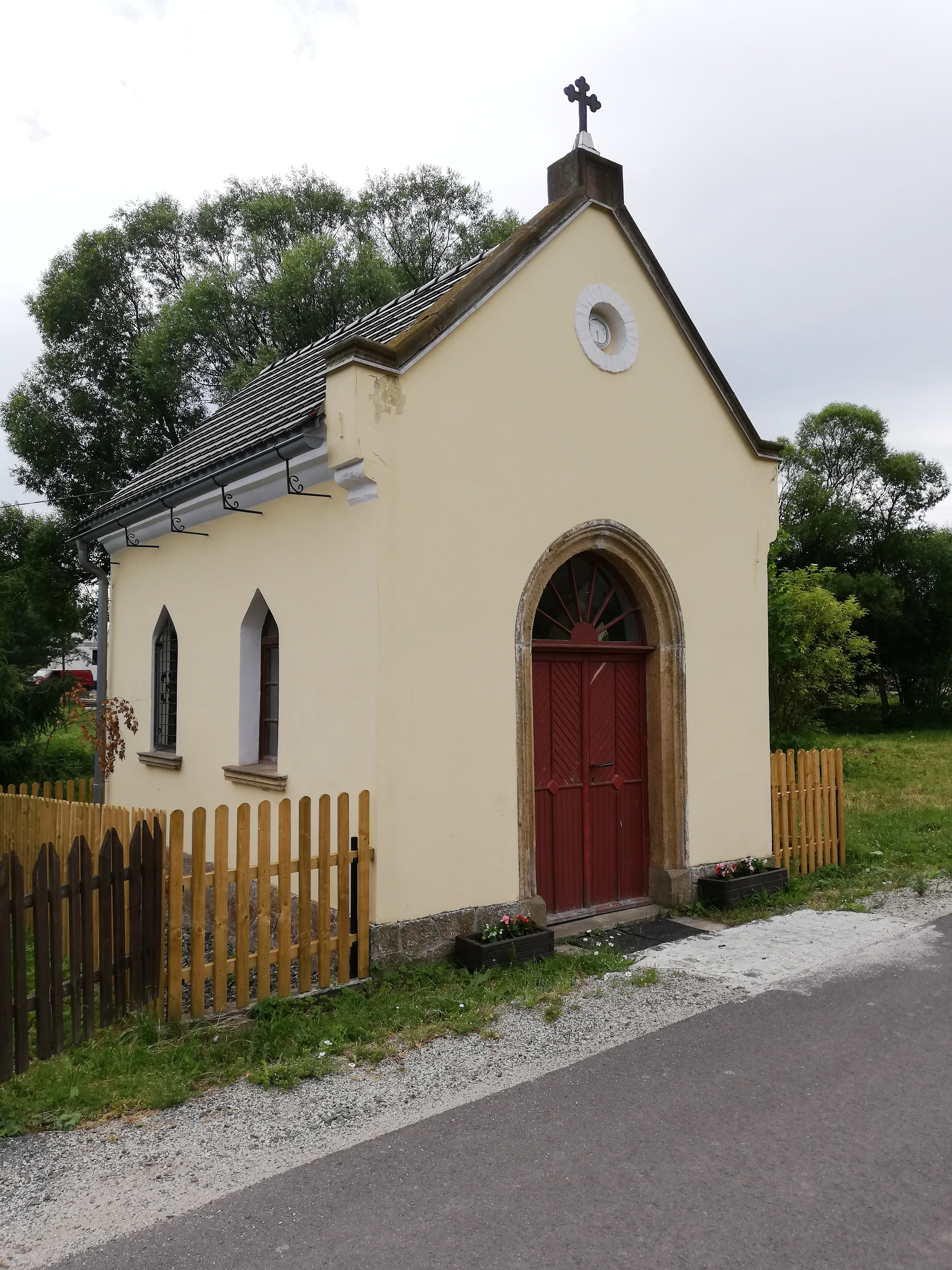
- Chapel in Błażejów

- Location within Poland
- Coordinates: 50°40′01″N 16°03′07″E
- Country: Poland
- Voivodeship: Lower Silesian
- County: Kamienna Góra
- Gmina: Lubawka
- Time zone: UTC+1 (CET)
  - Summer (DST): UTC+2 (CEST)
- Vehicle registration: DKA

Błażejów [bwaˈʐɛjuf] is a village in the administrative district of Gmina Lubawka, within Kamienna Góra County, Lower Silesian Voivodeship, in south-western Poland. It is situated at the foothills of the Krucze Mountains in the Central Sudetes.

After World War II, in 1945–1947, Poles expelled from Łanczyn in pre-war south-eastern Poland annexed by the Soviet Union settled in Błażejów.
