= Okrzeszyn, Lower Silesian Voivodeship =

Okrzeszyn
- Village
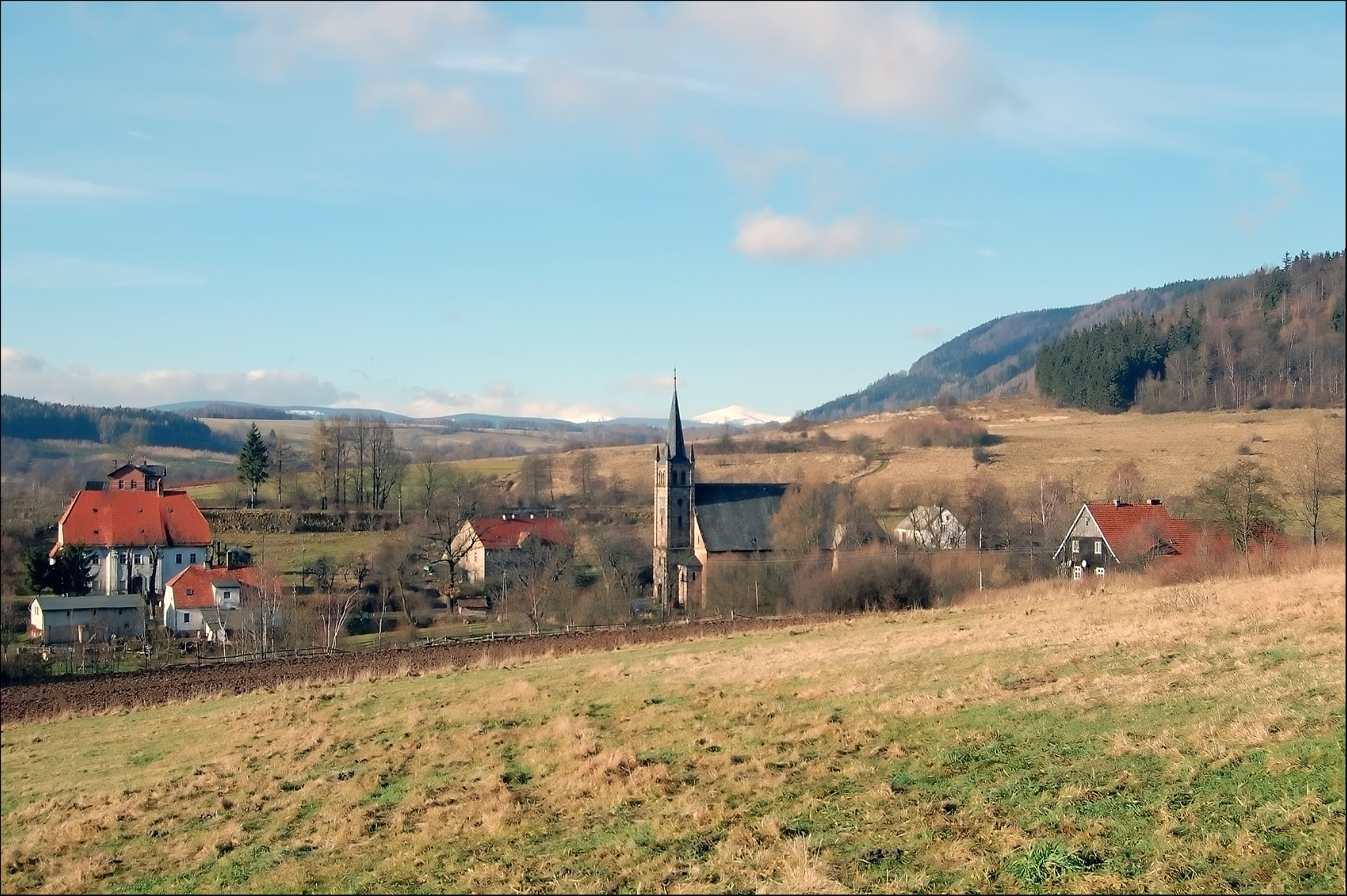
- Okrzeszyn

- Location within Poland
- Coordinates: 50°37′N 16°02′E
- Country: Poland
- Voivodeship: Lower Silesian
- County: Kamienna Góra
- Gmina: Lubawka

Population
  - Total: 278

Okrzeszyn [ɔˈkʂɛʂɨn] (German: Albendorf) is a village in the administrative district of Gmina Lubawka, within Kamienna Góra County, Lower Silesian Voivodeship, in south-western Poland, near the border with the Czech Republic.

== Gallery ==
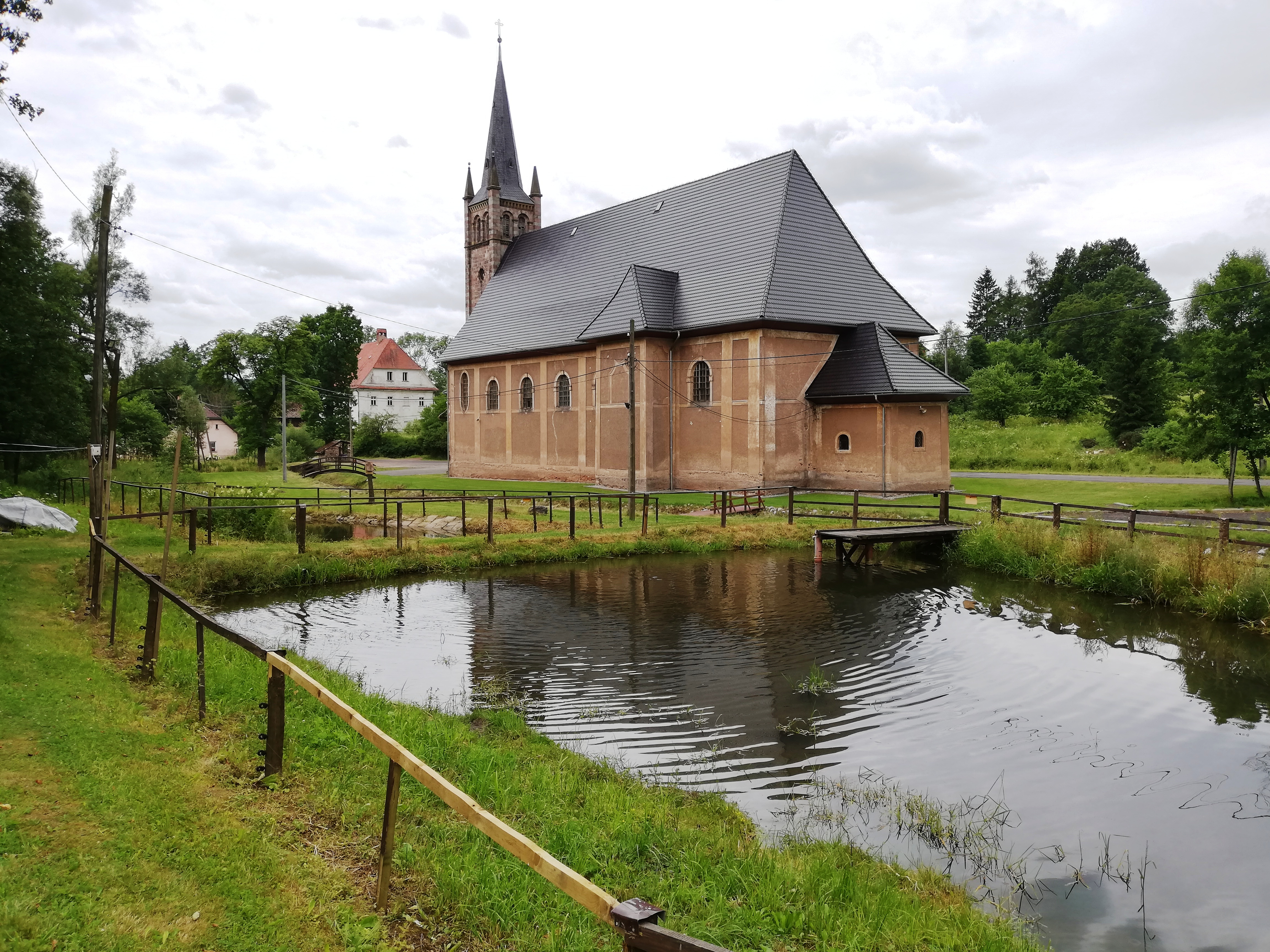
Church of the Nativity of the Virgin Mary

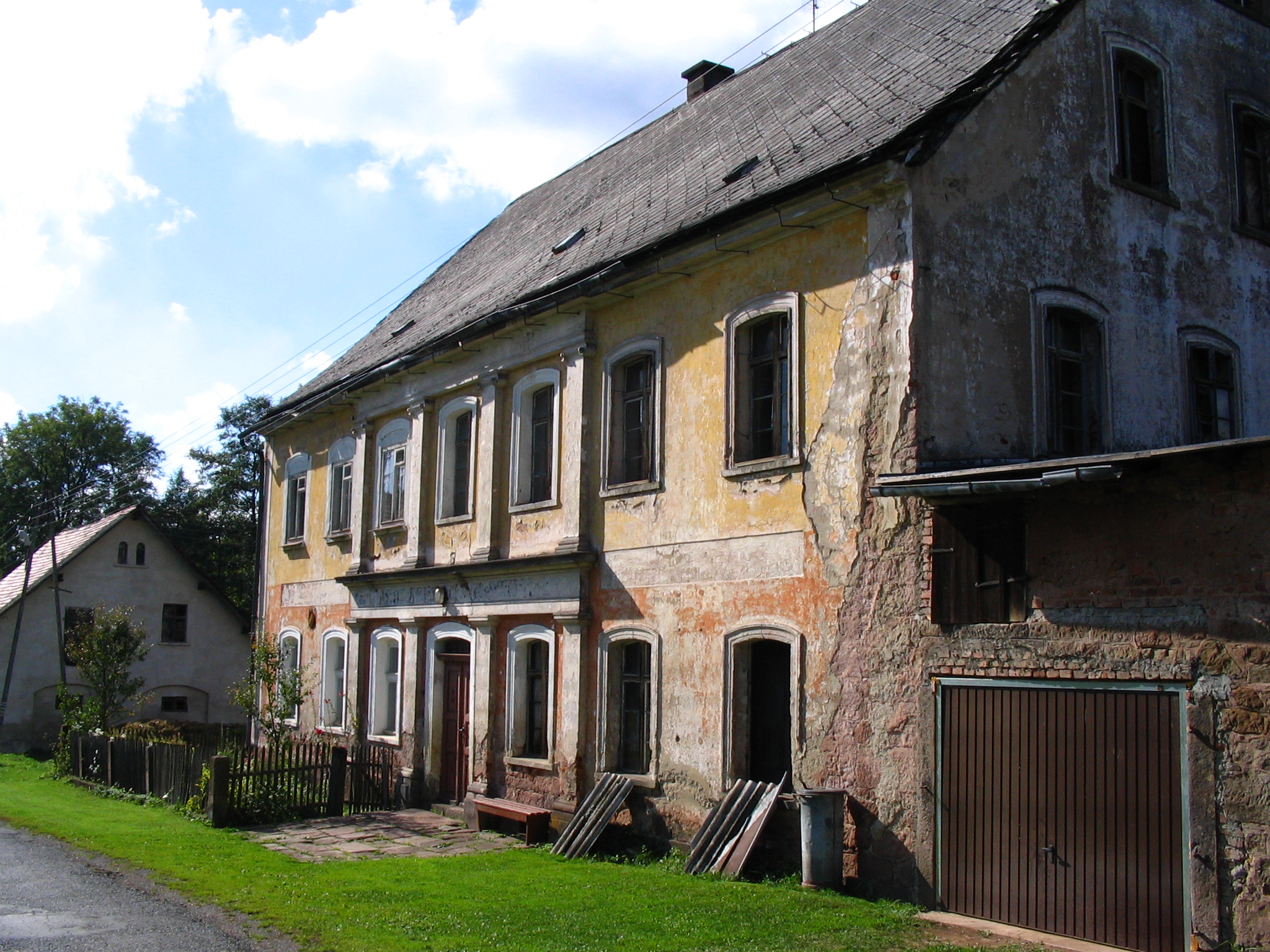
Old building in the village

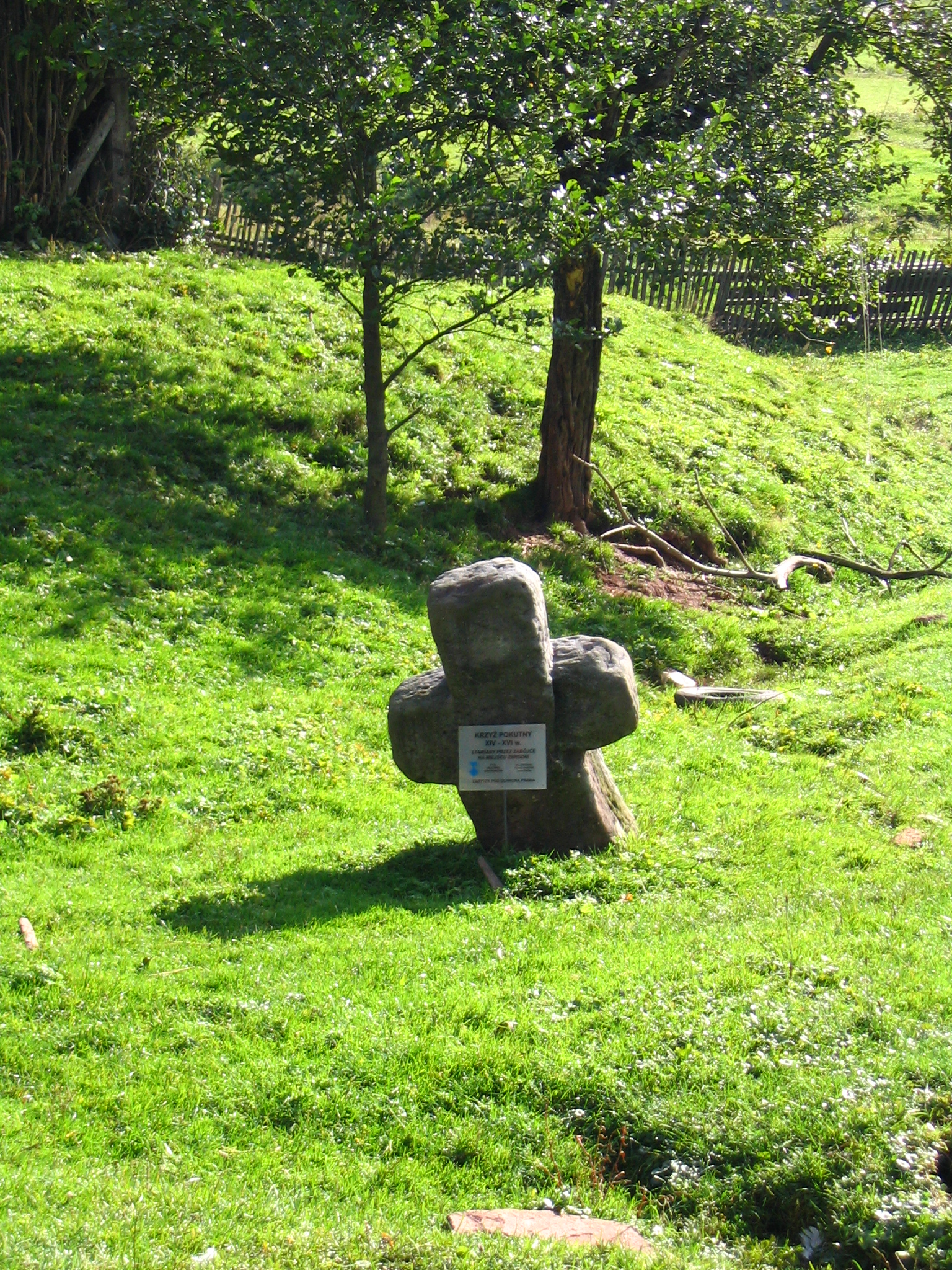
Conciliation cross from 1717

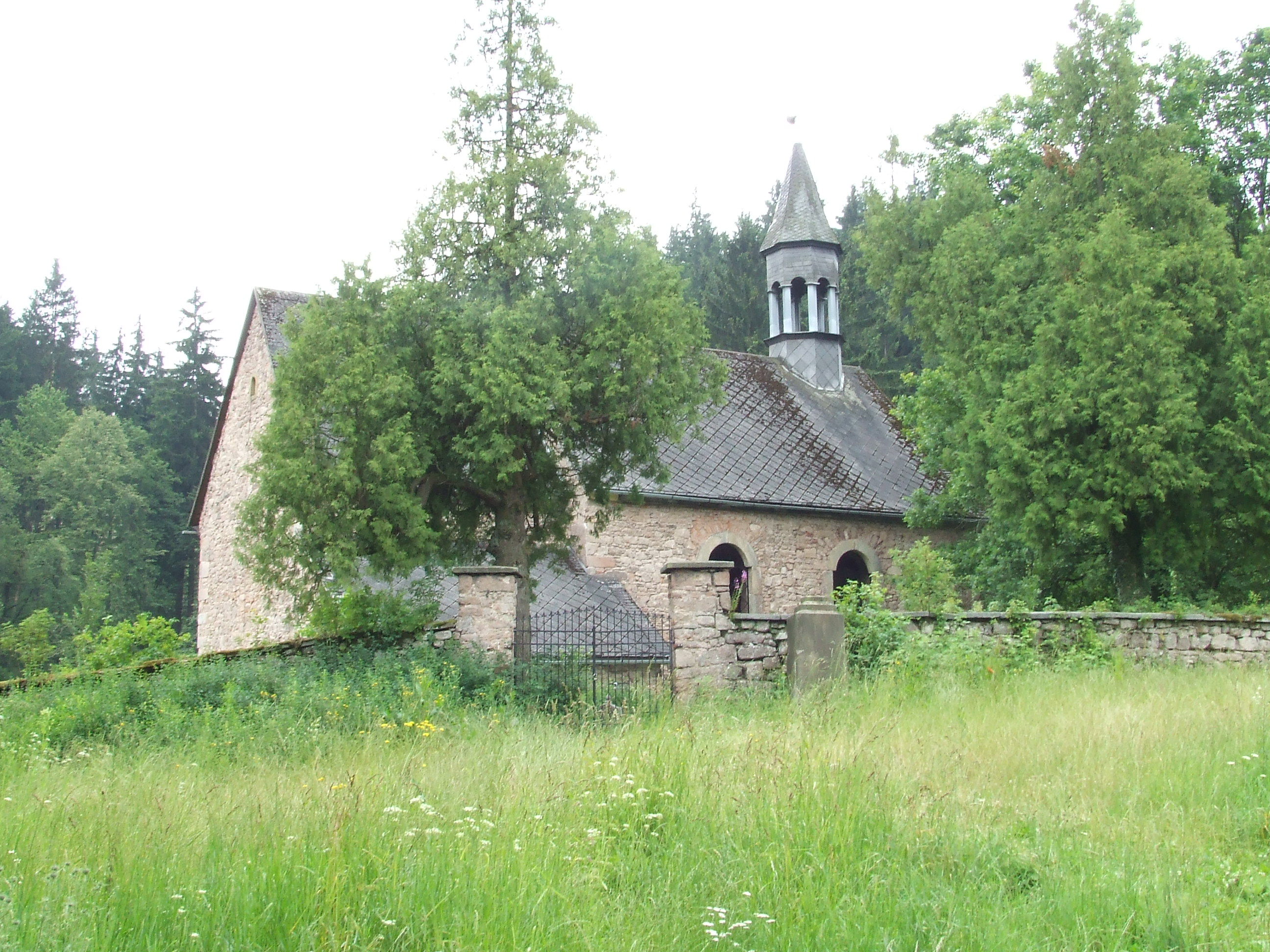
Ruins of the Church of Saint Michael

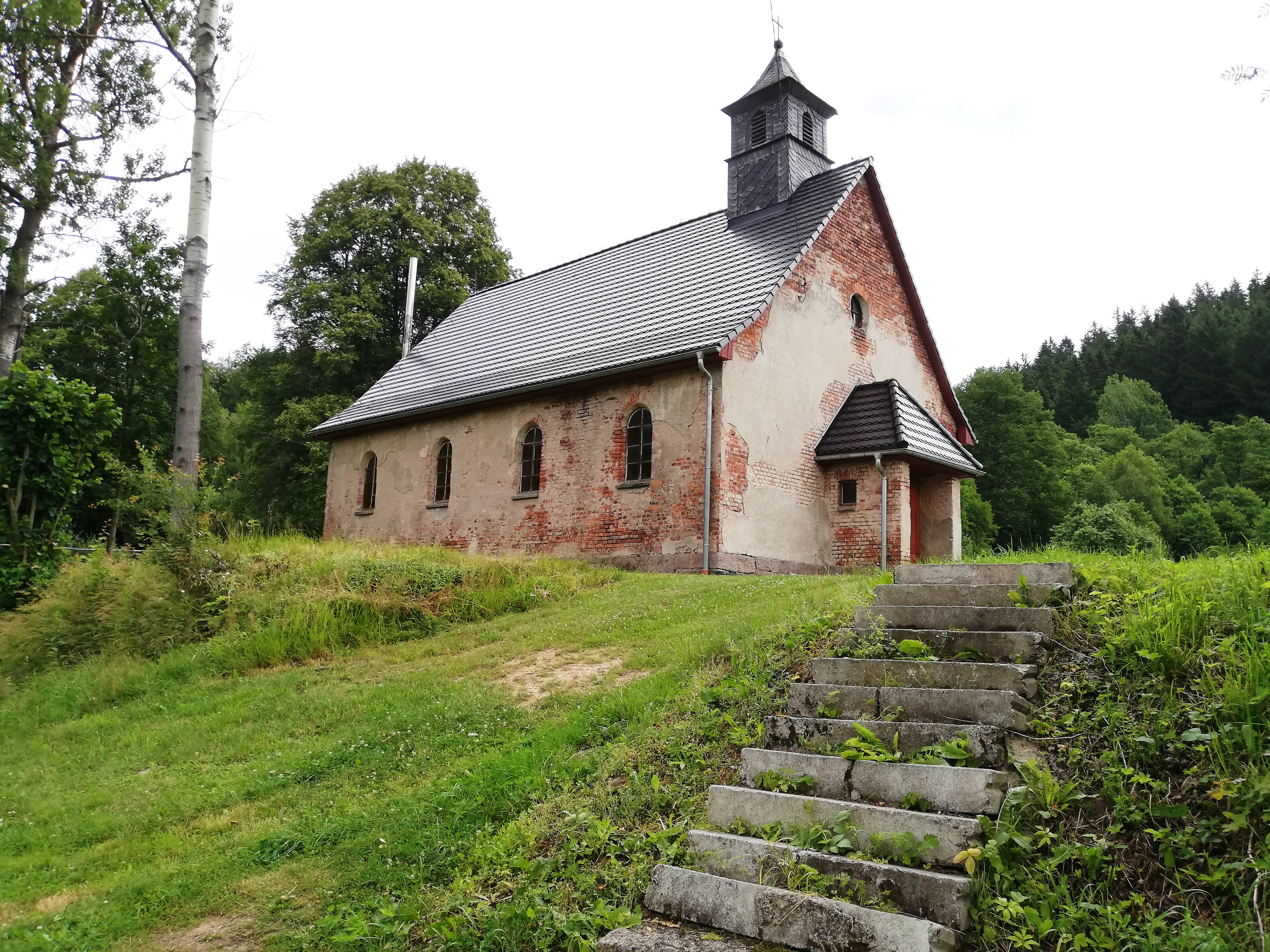
Former Chapel of Martin Luther

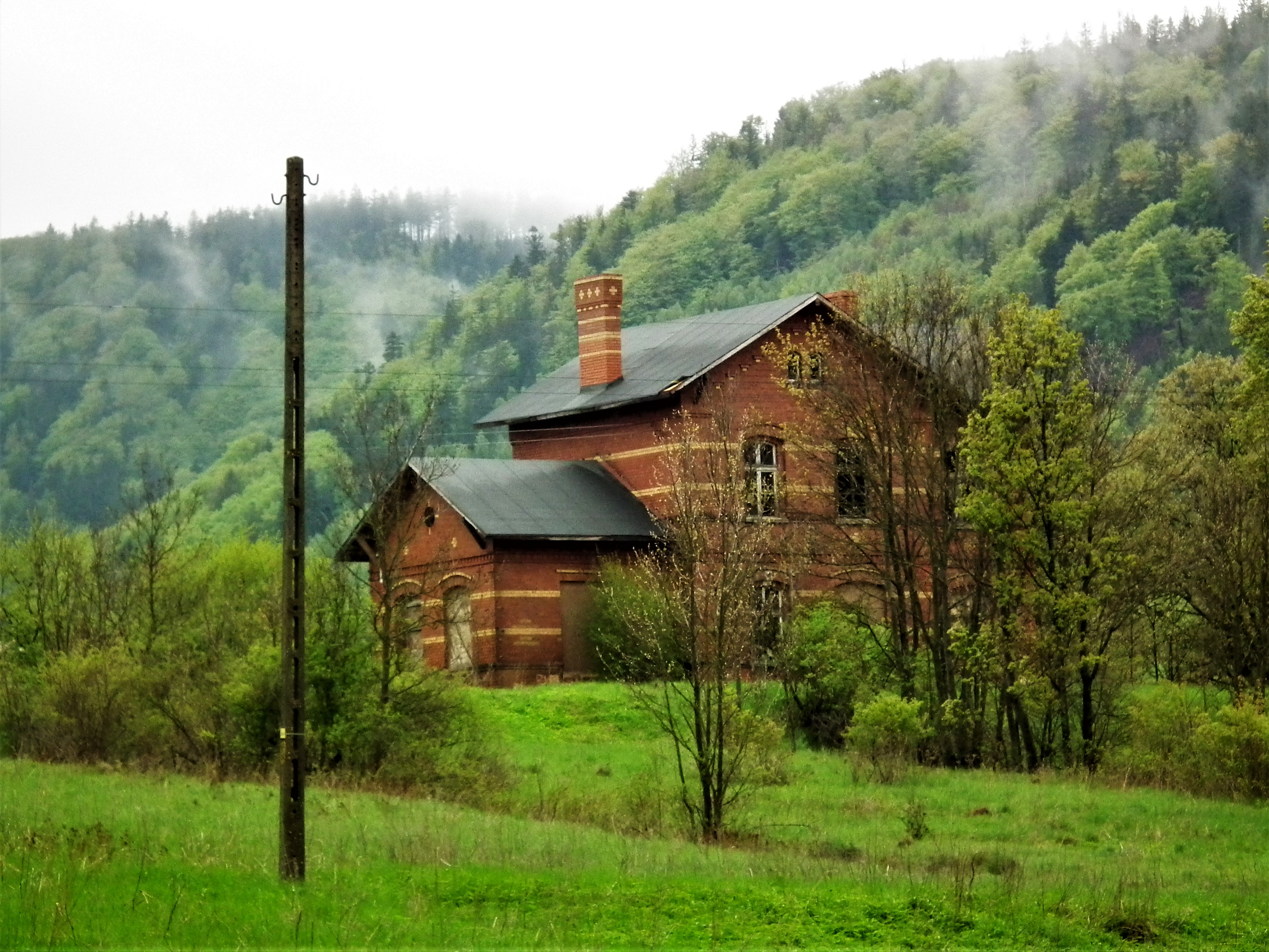
Former train station
