= Královec =

- Municipality
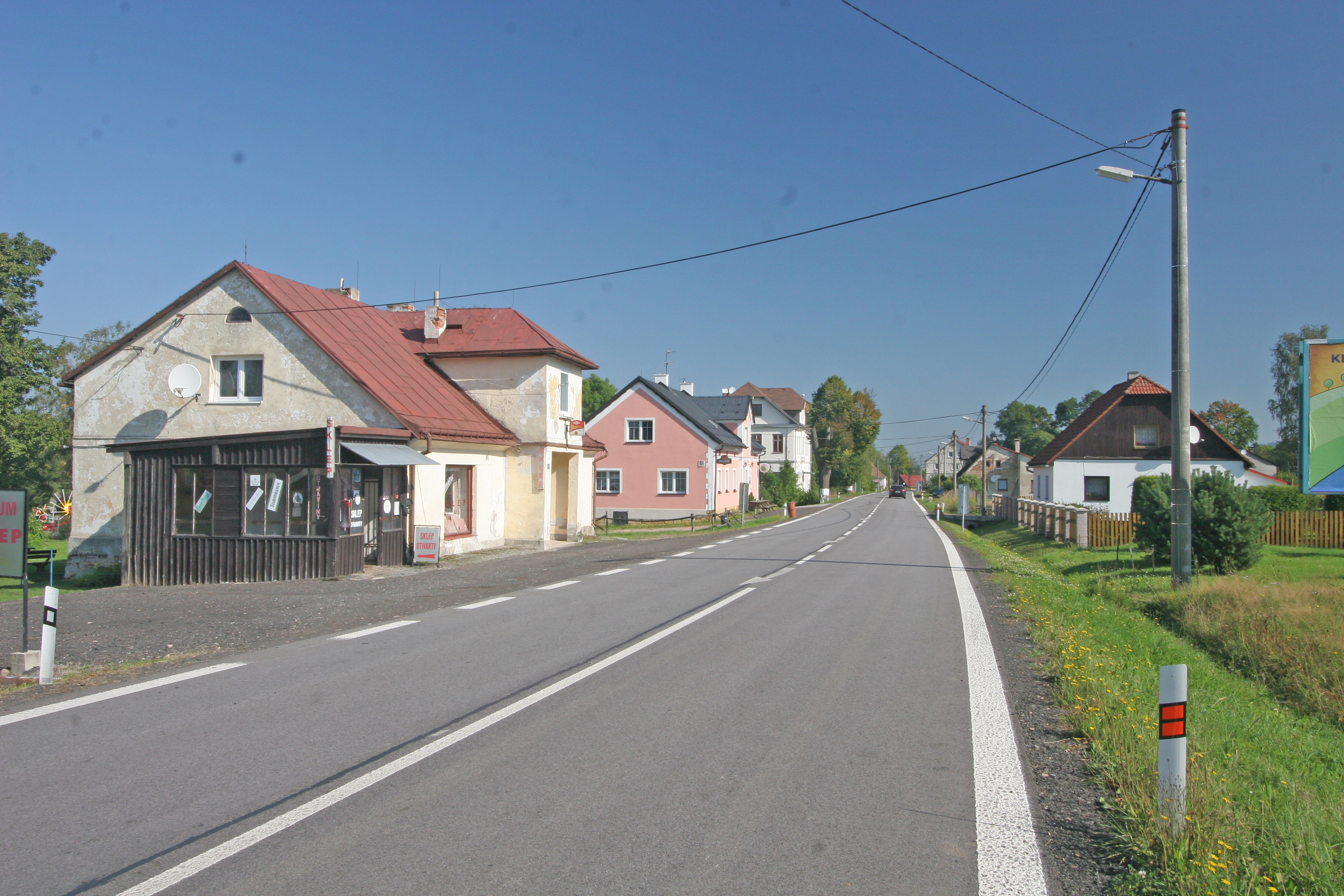
- Main road

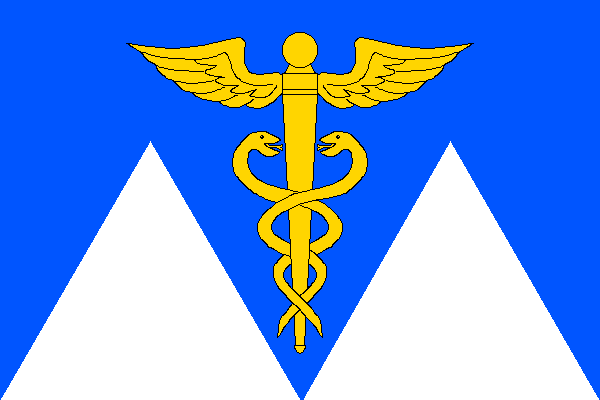
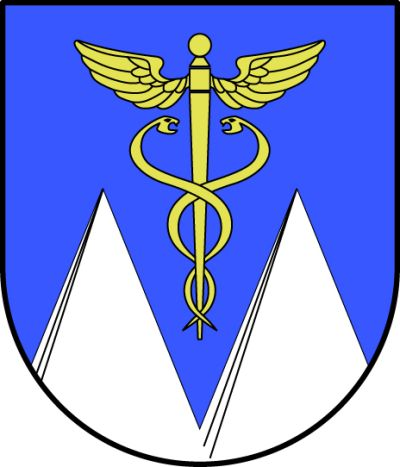
- Flag Coat of arms

- Location in the Czech Republic
- Coordinates: 50°40′36″N 15°58′26″E
- Country: Czech Republic
- Region: Hradec Králové
- District: Trutnov
- First mentioned: 1292

Area
  - Total: 9.94 km^{2} (3.84 sq mi)
- Elevation: 512 m (1,680 ft)

Population (2026-01-01)
  - Total: 183
  - Density: 18.4/km^{2} (47.7/sq mi)
- Time zone: UTC+1 (CET)
  - Summer (DST): UTC+2 (CEST)
- Postal code: 542 03
- Website: www.obeckralovec.cz

Královec (German: Königshan) is a municipality and village in Trutnov District in the Hradec Králové Region of the Czech Republic. It has about 200 inhabitants.

== Etymology ==
The German name Königshan was derived from Königshain (meaning "king's grove") and referred to a village founded on the site of a forest owned by the king. The Czech name was derived from the German name (from král = 'king').

== Geography ==
Královec is located about 13 kilometres (8 mi) north of Trutnov and 52 km (32 mi) north of Hradec Králové. The municipality borders Poland on the north and east. It lies in the Broumov Highlands. The highest point is the mountain Královecký Špičák at 881 m (2,890 ft) above sea level.

== History ==
The first written mention of the village of Královec is from 1292, however, the woods in the area under the name Königshein were mentioned already in 1007. During its existence, the village was alternately part of the Žacléř estate, or it was owned by the town of Trutnov or by the Krzeszów Abbey.

== Demographics ==
Historical population

Year	Pop.	±%
1869	769	—
1880	861	+12.0%
1890	830	−3.6%
1900	824	−0.7%
1910	840	+1.9%

Year	Pop.	±%
1921	836	−0.5%
1930	758	−9.3%
1950	394	−48.0%
1961	382	−3.0%
1970	294	−23.0%

Year	Pop.	±%
1980	223	−24.1%
1991	170	−23.8%
2001	176	+3.5%
2011	170	−3.4%
2021	160	−5.9%

Source: Censuses

== Economy ==
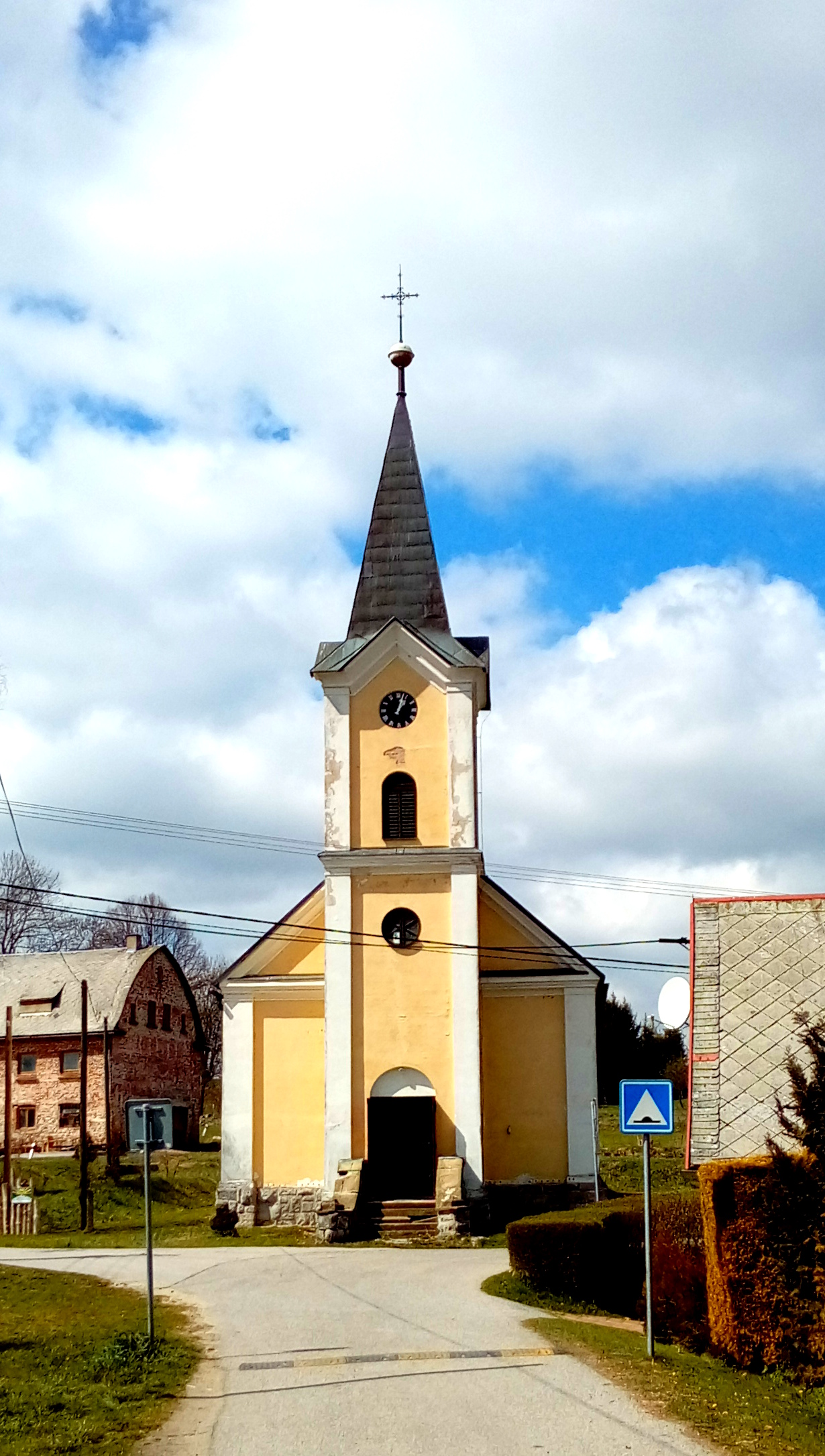
Church of Saint John of Nepomuk

There is a quarry in the municipal territory where solid volcanic rocks are mined.

== Transport ==
The I/16 road connects the Czech–Polish border with Trutnov. On the Czech–Polish border is the railway border crossing and road border crossing Královec / Lubawka.

Královec is located on the railway line Trutnov–Sędzisław.

== Sights ==
The main landmark of Královec is the Church of Saint John of Nepomuk. It was built in 1924–1928.

The only protected cultural monuments are a statue of St. John of Nepomuk dating from 1762 and a small medieval conciliation cross.

== Notable people ==
- Mathias Czwiczek (1601–1654), painter

== Gallery ==
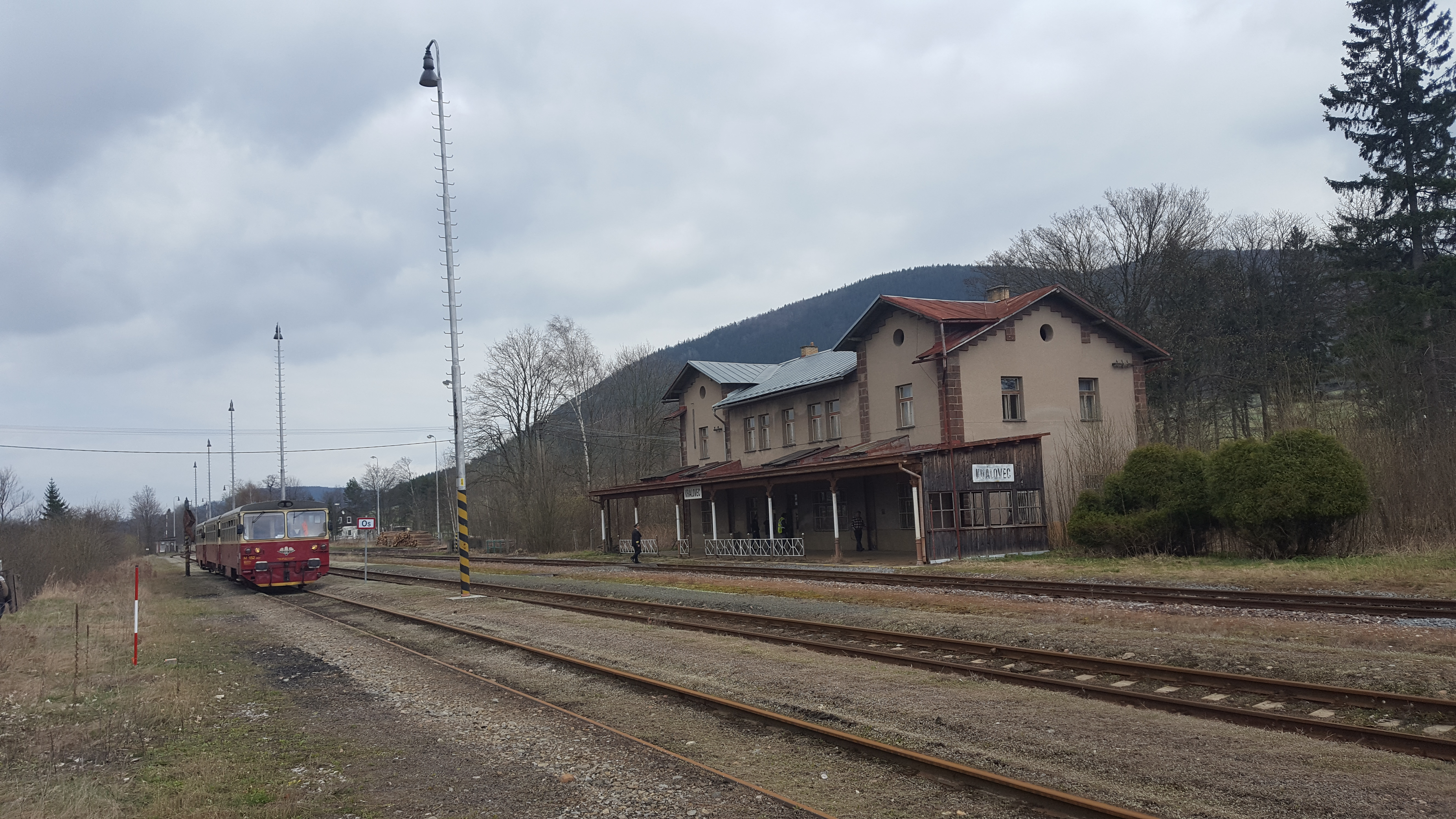
Train station

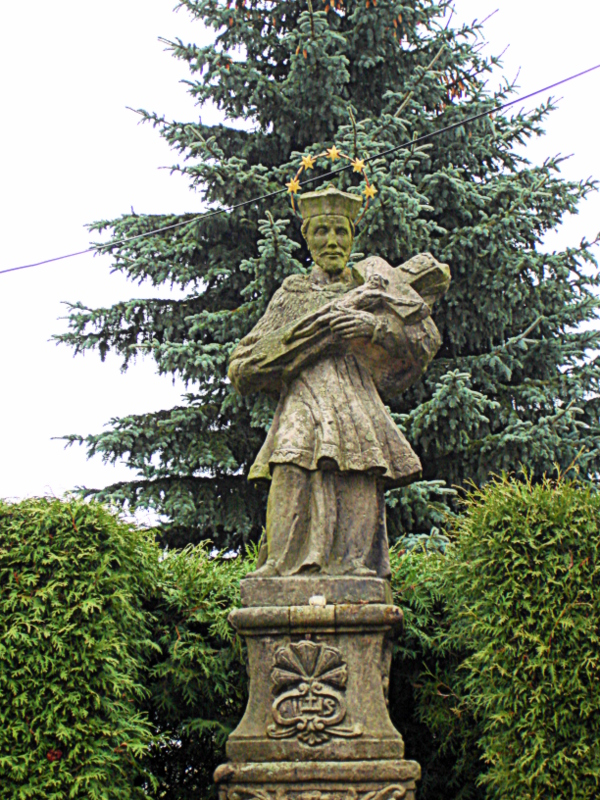
Statue of Saint John of Nepomuk
