= Kamienna Góra =

Town in Lower Silesian Voivodeship, Poland

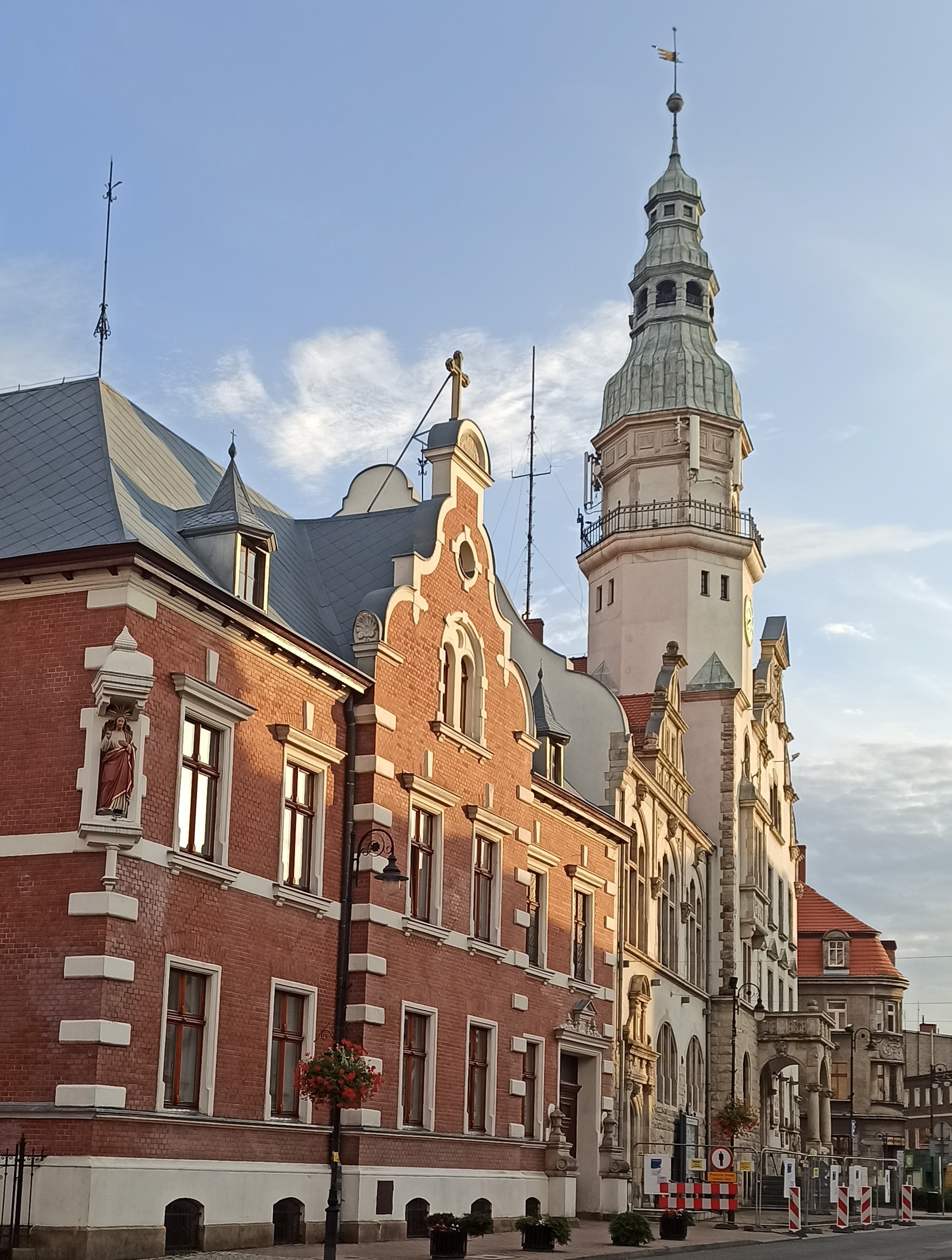
- Town hall

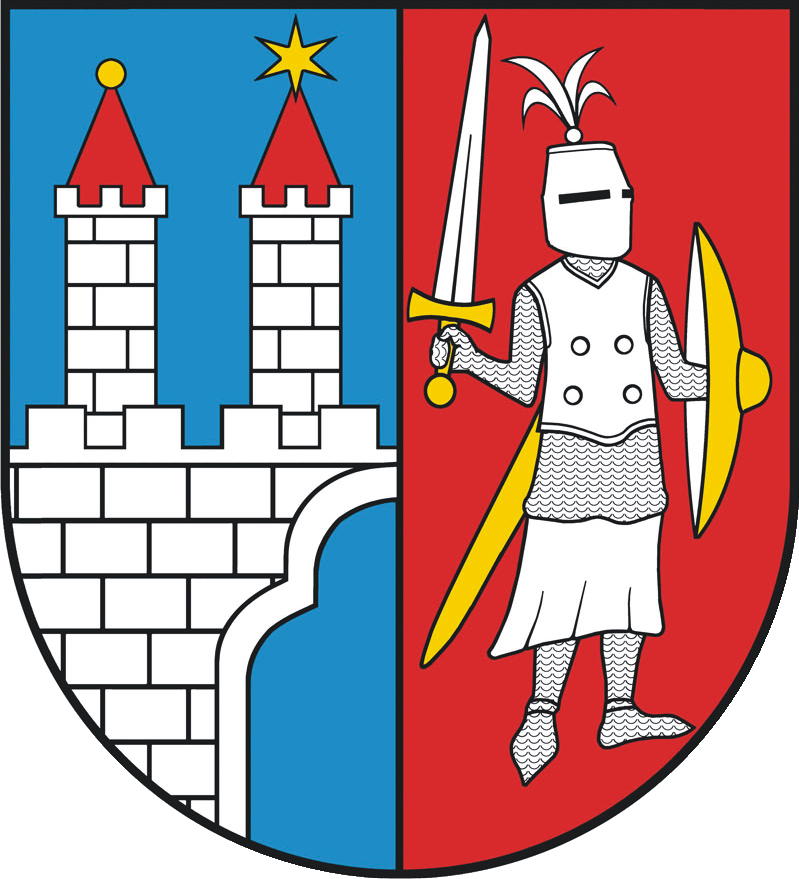
- Flag Coat of arms

- Location within Poland
- Coordinates: 50°47′N 16°02′E
- Country: Poland
- Voivodeship: Lower Silesian
- County: Kamienna Góra
- Gmina: Kamienna Góra (urban gmina)
- First mentioned: 1232
- Town rights: 1292

Government
  - Mayor: Janusz Chodasewicz

Area
  - Total: 17.97 km^{2} (6.94 sq mi)

Population (2019-06-30)
  - Total: 19,010
  - Density: 1,058/km^{2} (2,740/sq mi)
- Time zone: UTC+1 (CET)
  - Summer (DST): UTC+2 (CEST)
- Postal code: 58-400
- Car plates: DKA
- Website: http://www.kamiennagora.pl

Kamienna Góra [kaˈmʲɛnːa ˈɡura] (German: Landeshut, Czech: Lanžhot or Kamenná Hora) is a town in south-western Poland with 18,235 inhabitants (2023). It is the seat of Kamienna Góra County, and also of the rural district called Gmina Kamienna Góra, although it is not part of the territory of the latter (the town forms a separate urban gmina).

Kamienna Góra on the Bóbr river is situated in Lower Silesian Voivodeship between the Stone Mountains and the Rudawy Janowickie at the old trade route from Silesia to Prague, today part of the National Road No. 5.

== History ==
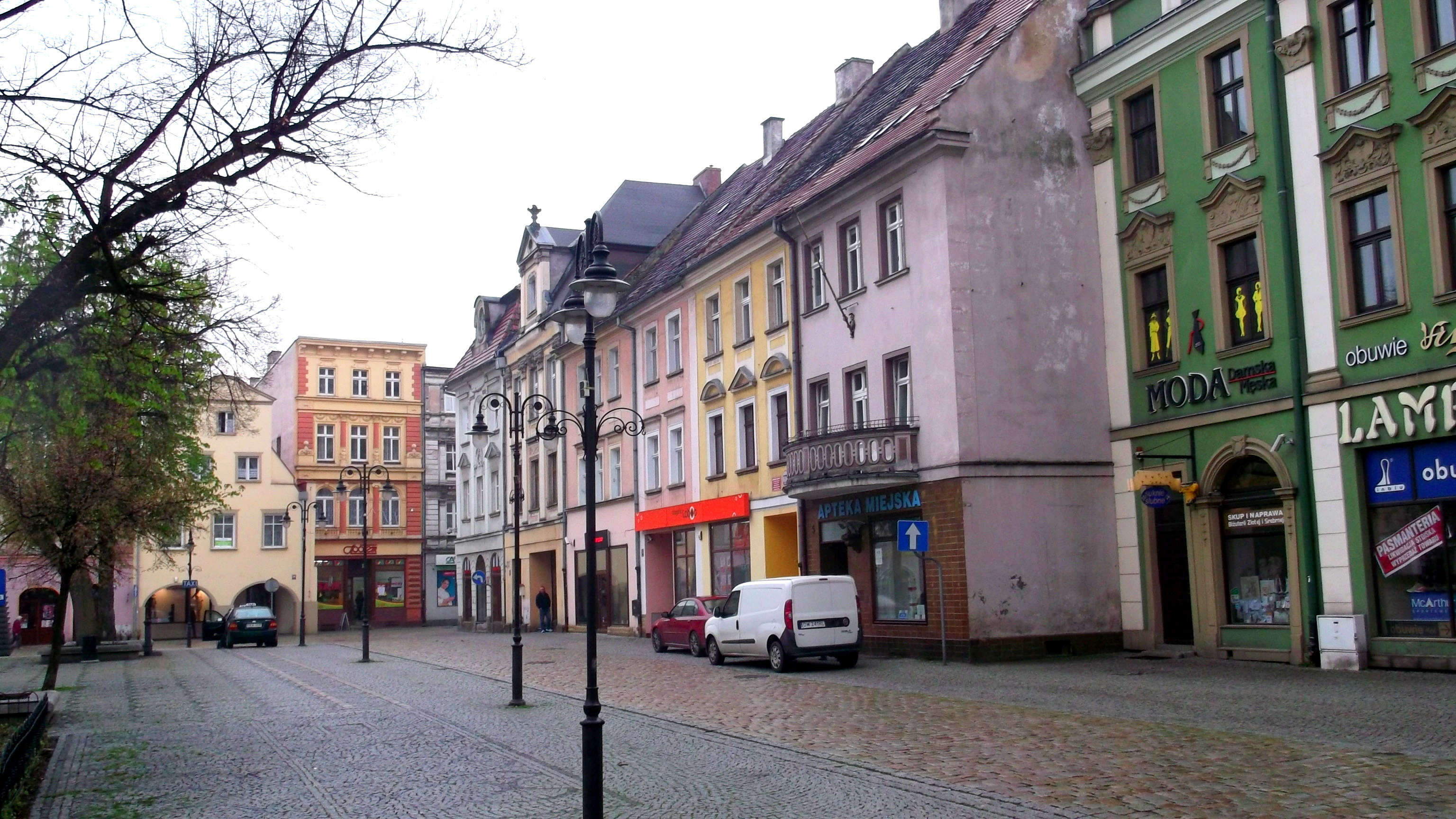
Historic townhouses at the Freedom Square

The area was part of the Great Moravian Empire in the Early Middle Ages, and became part of the emerging Polish state in the 10th century under its first ruler Mieszko I of Poland. During the times of the fragmentation of Poland it was part of the duchies of Silesia, Legnica, Jawor and Świdnica. In the early 13th century, Polish Duke Henry the Bearded erected a defensive castle at the site, due to its proximity to the Polish–Czech border. The settlement was mentioned in documents from 1232 (as Landeshut) and 1249 (as Landishute and Landishute forensis auch Camena Gora). In 1254 the Piast Duke Bolesław II the Bald of Legnica gave the area to the Benedictine monastery of Opatovice (in eastern Bohemia), who already had established the Krzeszów Abbey at nearby Krzeszów. When the abbey passed to the Cistercians in 1289, Kamienna Góra was acquired by Duke Bolko I the Strict of Świdnica, who extended it as a stronghold against the nearby Kingdom of Bohemia and granted town rights in 1292. In 1295, Poles repelled a Bohemian invasion, and Bolko I declared he would not allow any Bohemian or German ruler in Silesia. Kamienna Góra received new privileges from Duke Bolko II the Small in 1334. In 1345 the heavily fortified town was captured by the Bohemians, probably by digging an underground tunnel. In 1348 it was recaptured by the Poles, probably by using a ruse modeled on the Trojan Horse. Carts with hidden soldiers, supposedly filled with hay or other goods, were reportedly used. Nevertheless, the duchy fell to the Bohemian crown with Bolko's death in 1368. It burnt down during the 1426 Hussite campaign to Silesia and in the 1460s it passed to the Kingdom of Hungary, before in 1490 it fell back to Bohemia, then under the rule of Vladislaus II, who erected new town walls.

During the Thirty Years' War the town was plundered by Austrian and Swedish troops. As a result of the war, only two residents remained in the town in 1639. After Frederick II of Prussia had conquered Silesia with Landeshut in 1742, it was the site of 12 battles during the Silesian Wars. The two largest were fought on 22 May 1745 and 23 June 1760. In the former Prussians defeated Austrian, Hungarian and Croatian forces, and in the latter Austrians defeated a Prussian corps. It was one of the locations of the Silesian weavers' uprising of 1793, brutally crushed by Prussian troops.

From 1871 the town formed part of Germany. The town was not destroyed during World War I and II. With the rise of Nazism among the Germans, a local branch of the NSDAP was established in 1929, and soon five Nazis became town councilors. In 1934, a local branch of the Hitler Youth was established. The town's mayor, Günther Ries, supported the Nazis and provided funding for the Hitler Youth. The Nazis held three party ceremonies in the town, on 22 June 1935, 9 November 1937 and 2 March 1939. During Kristallnacht in 1938, the Germans destroyed a synagogue and four Jewish stores.

During World War II, the Germans established and operated a subcamp of the Gross-Rosen concentration camp. Around 1,600 men, mostly Poles, and also smaller groups of other ethnicities, were imprisoned and used as forced labour in the subcamp, and many of them died. There was also a forced labour camp for Jews. It was captured by the Soviets on 9 May 1945, and after the war it became again part of Poland, although with a Soviet-installed communist regime, which stayed in power until the Fall of Communism in the 1980s.

A time of insecurity began for the German townspeople, who were outlawed, repeately driven out of their homes, and had to wear white armbands. Between May 8 and May 24, almost all population of the town and the county was deported to Allied-occupied Germany, in accordance with the Potsdam Agreement. The town was repopulated by Poles, expellees from former eastern Poland annexed by the Soviet Union and settlers from central Poland. Initially renamed to the 19th-century Polish name Kamieniogóra, in 1946 the name Kamienna Góra, which was first recorded in 1249, was adopted. The Polish anti-communist resistance was active in Kamienna Góra, including the nationwide Freedom and Independence Association, the local military Polish National Party–Polish National Self-Defence and four youth organizations.

From 1975 to 1998, it was administratively located in the Jelenia Góra Voivodeship.

== Sights ==
The main historic district of Kamienna Góra is the Old Town (Stare Miasto) with the Freedom (Plac Wolności), Grunwald Squares (Plac Grunwaldzki) and Brewery (Plac Browarowy) Squares, filled with numerous historic buildings. Among the historic sights of Kamienna Góra are:

- Gothic churches of Saints Peter and Paul and Corpus Christi
- Baroque Church of Our Lady of the Rosary
- Town Hall
- Weaving Museum (Muzeum Tkactwa)
- Lower Silesian Rehabilitation Center (Dolnośląskie Centrum Rehabilitacji)
- Culture Centre (Centrum Kultury)
- ZUS office
- preserved medieval town walls
- ruins of the Grodztwo Castle
- numerous historic townhouses and buildings, incl. the train station, tax office, high school, courthouse, etc.

There are also several monuments dedicated to the victims of the local branch of the Nazi German Gross-Rosen concentration camp.

== Cuisine ==
The officially protected traditional food of Kamienna Góra, as designated by the Ministry of Agriculture and Rural Development of Poland, is the kamiennogórski ser pleśniowy (Kamienna Góra blue cheese).

== Gallery ==
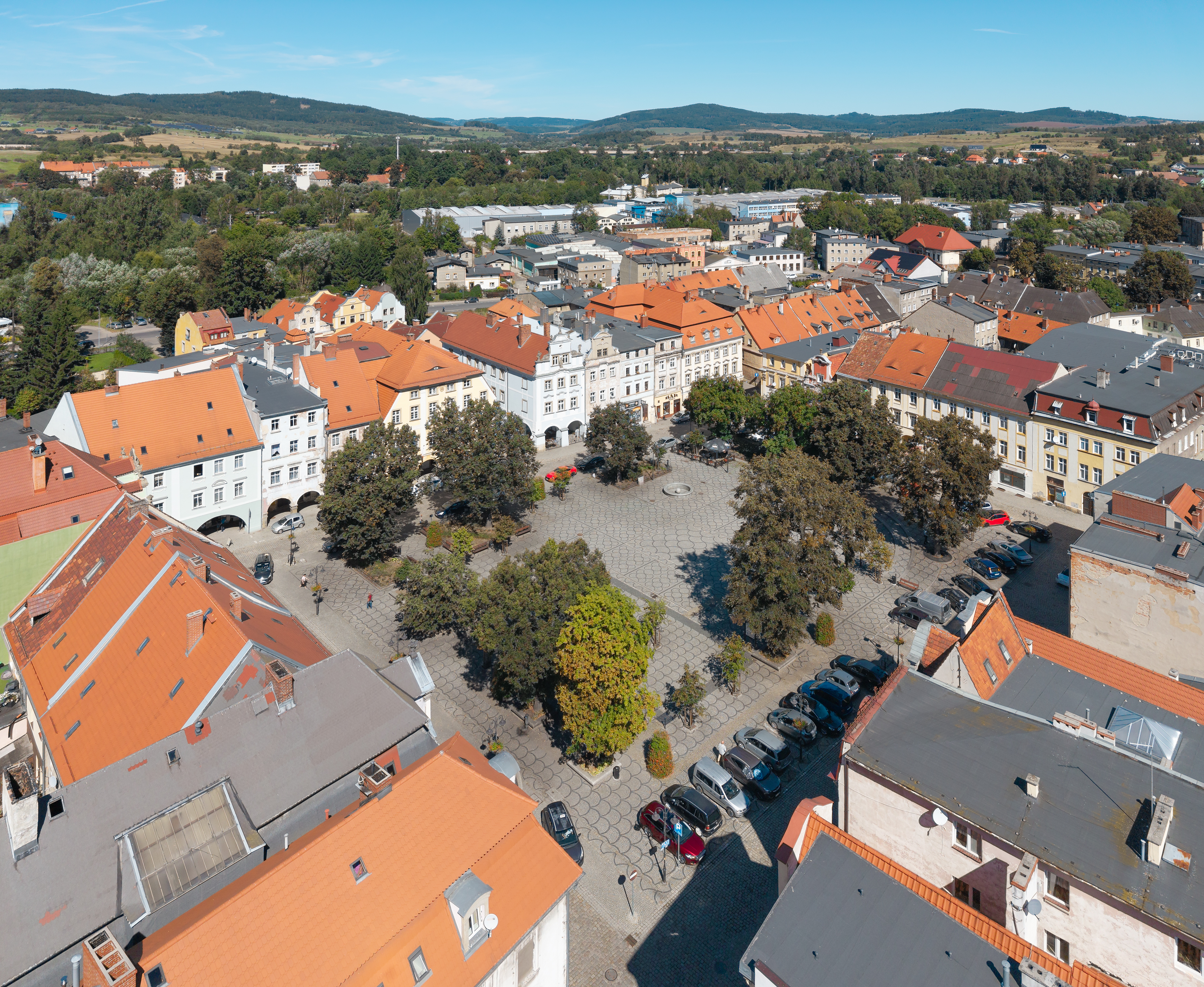
Market square

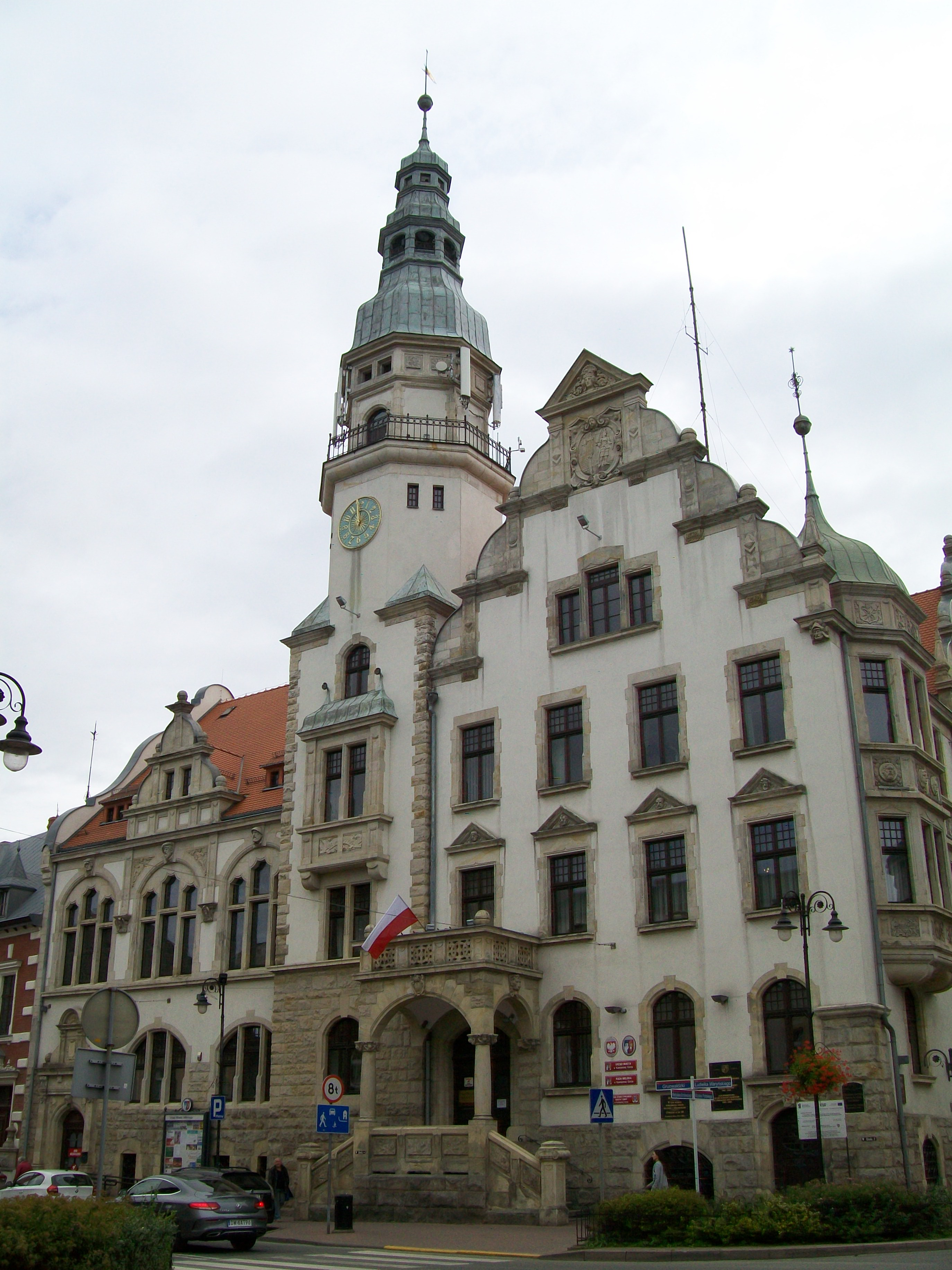
Town Hall

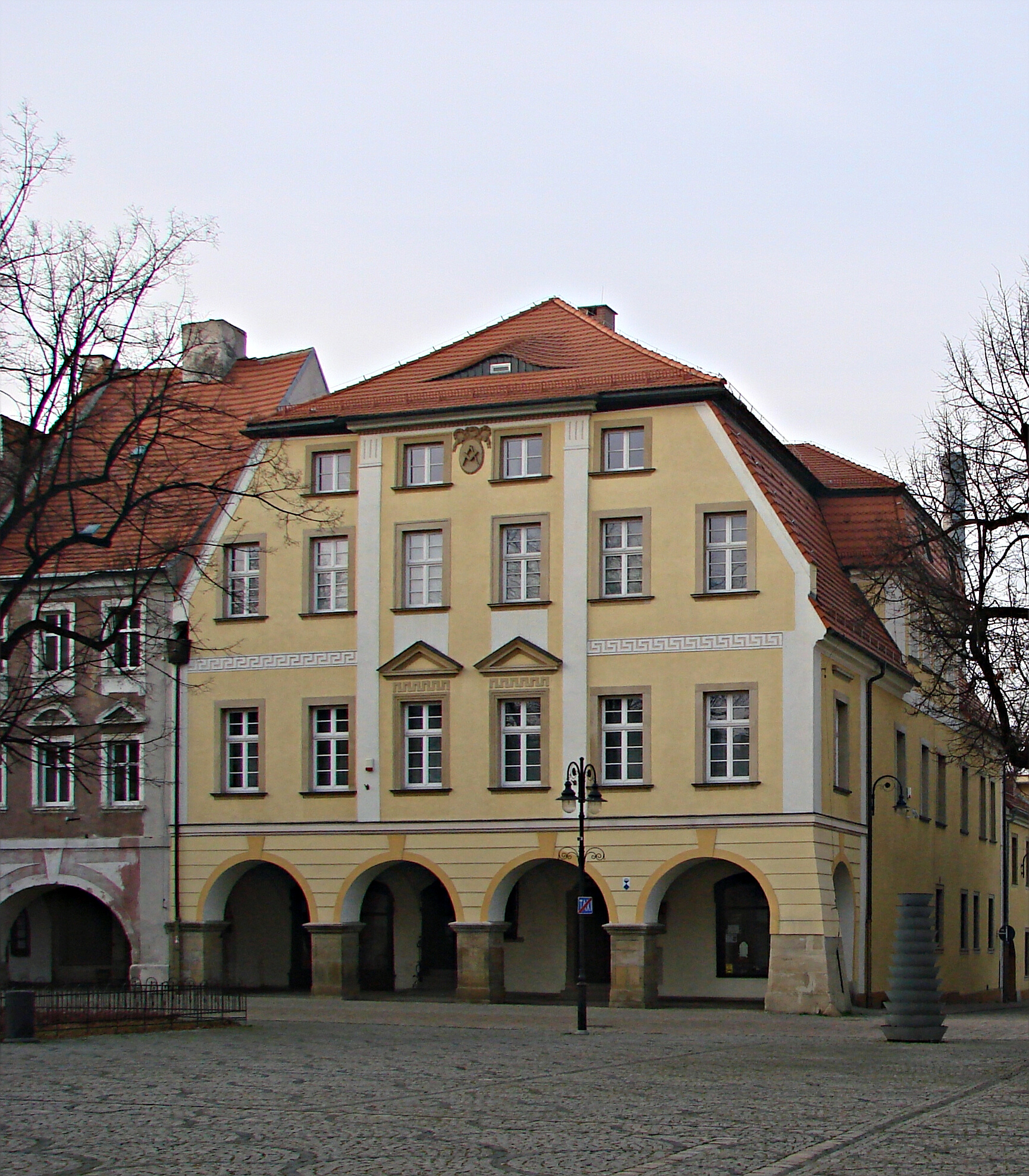
Weaving Museum (Muzeum Tkactwa)

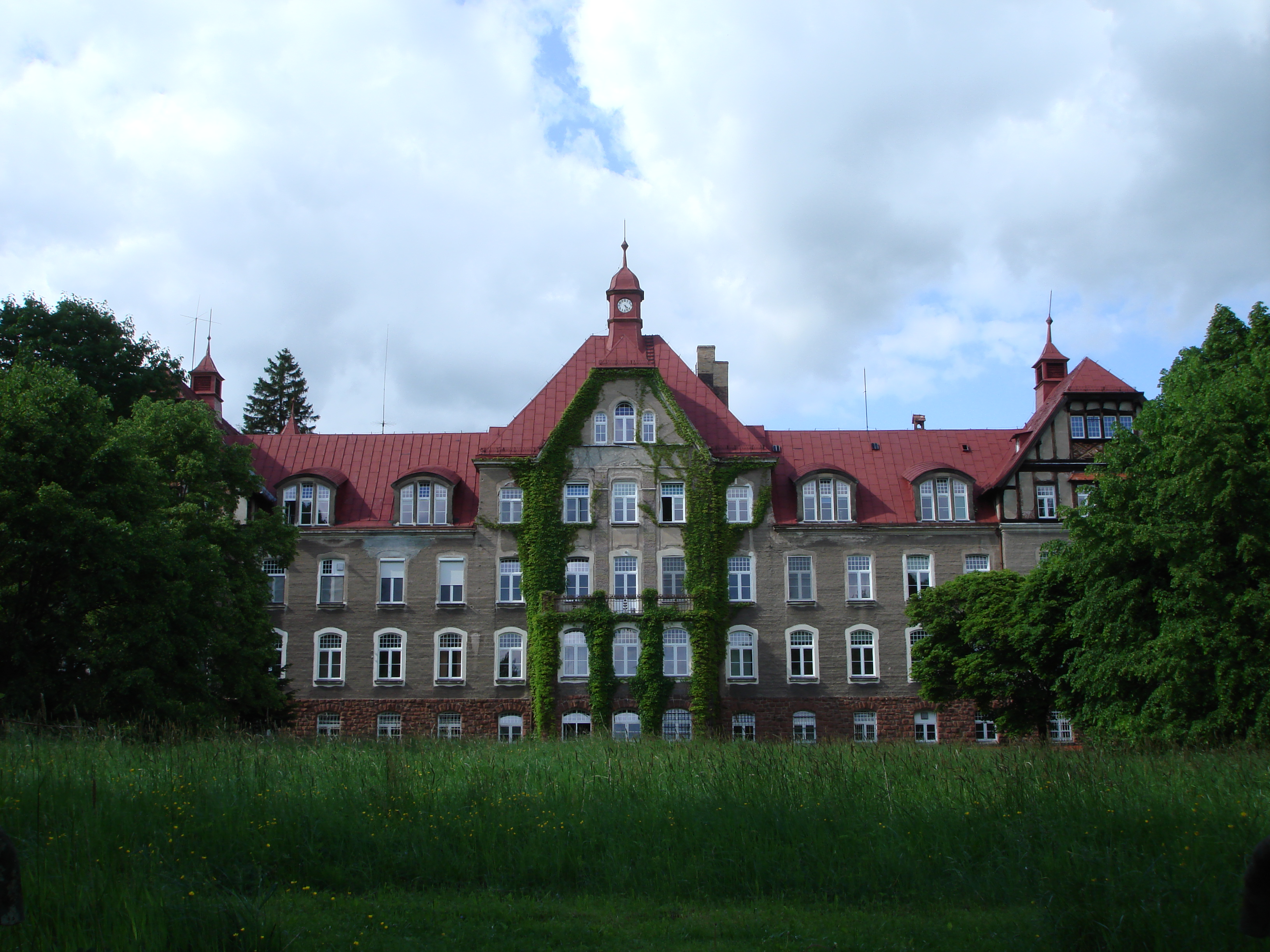
Lower Silesian Rehabilitation Center

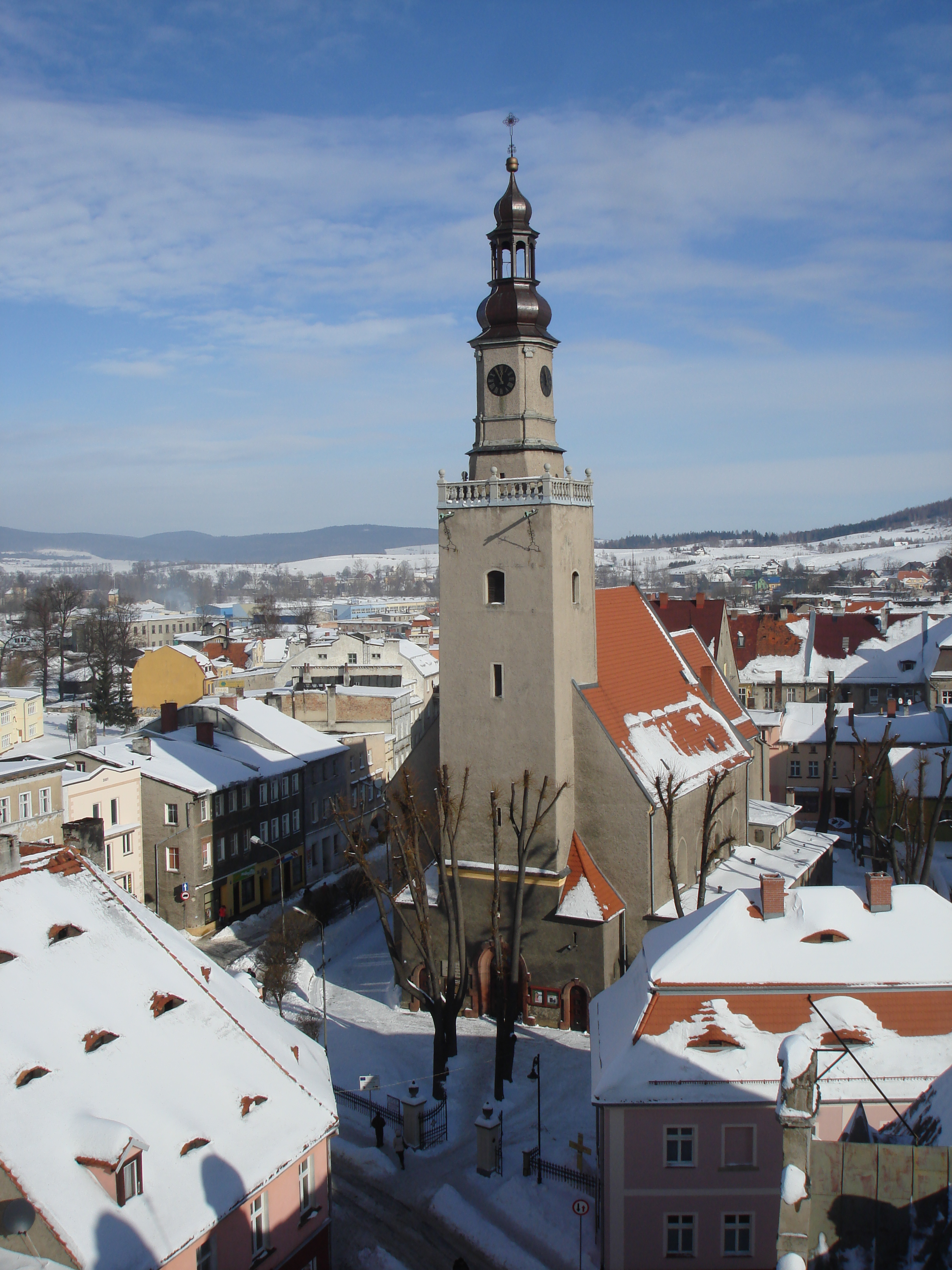
Gothic Church of Saints Peter und Paul

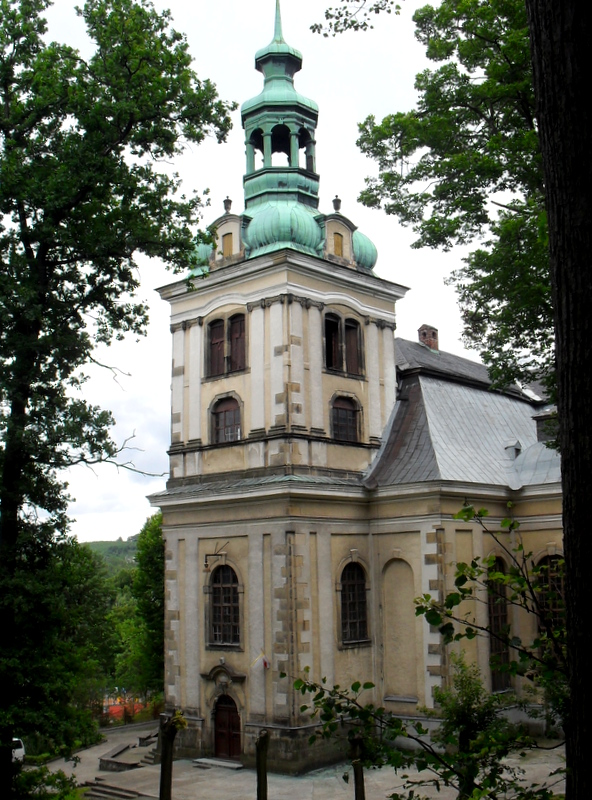
Baroque Church of Our Lady of the Rosary

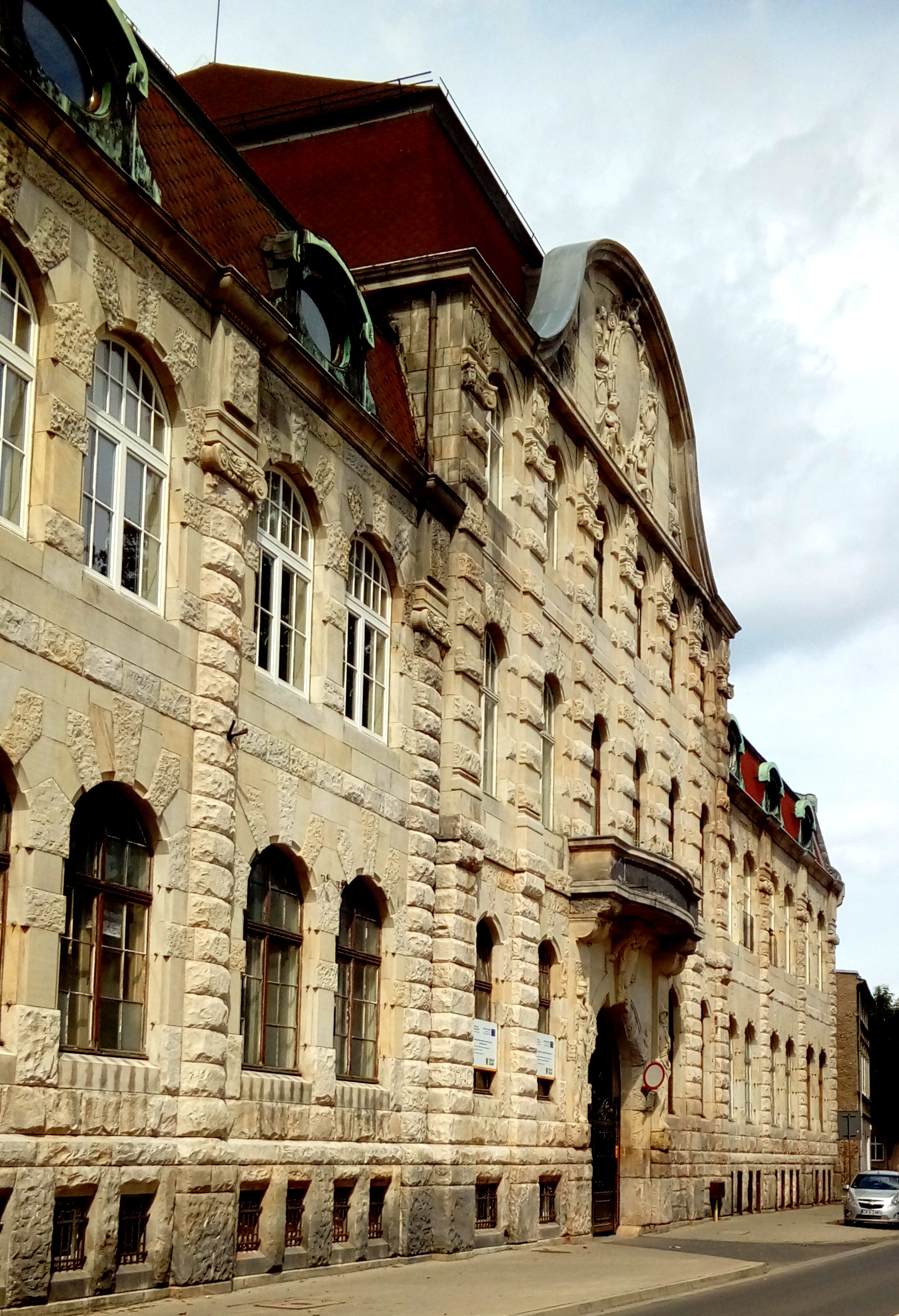
Culture Centre

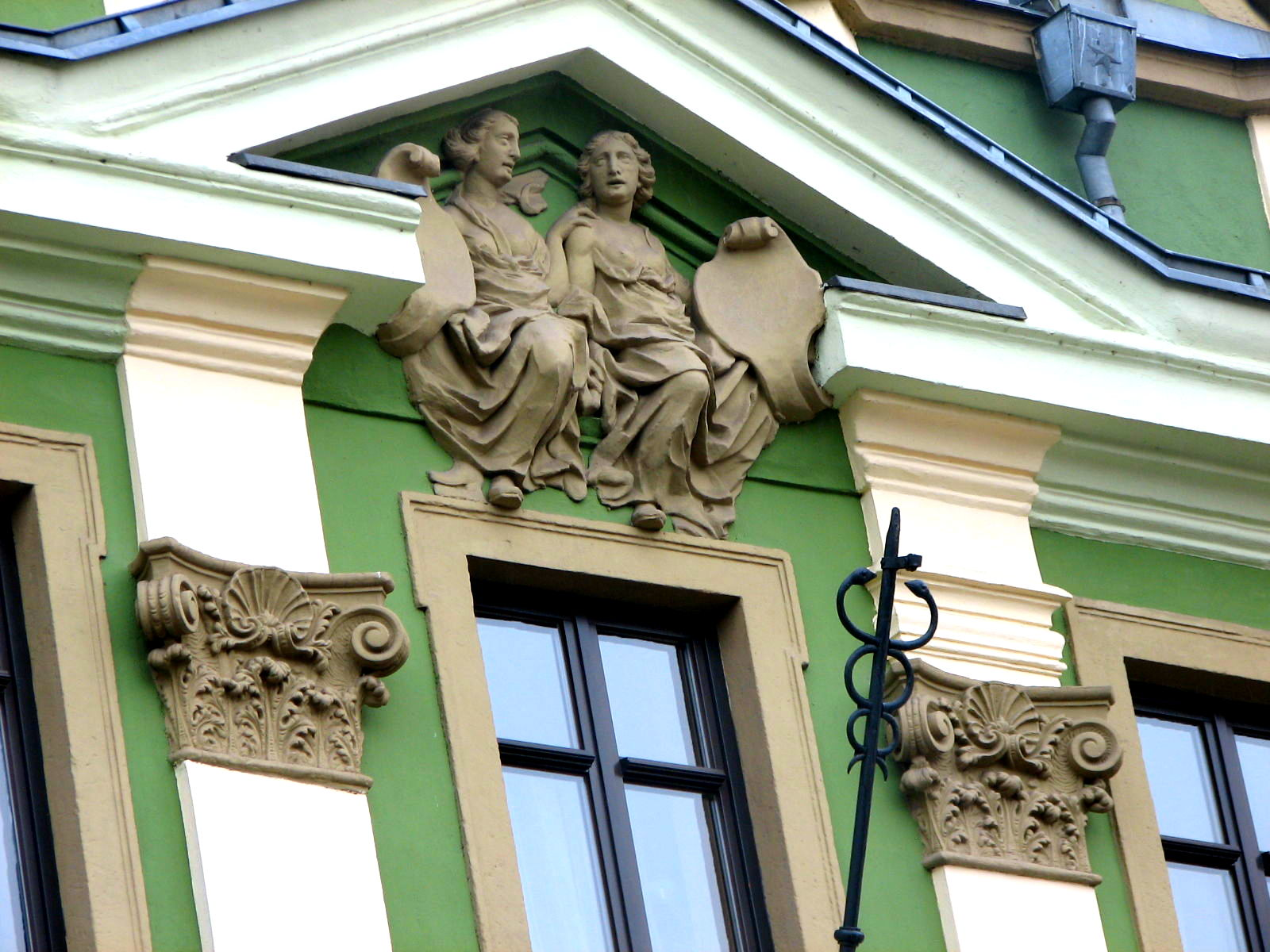
Architectural decorations of one of the old townhouses

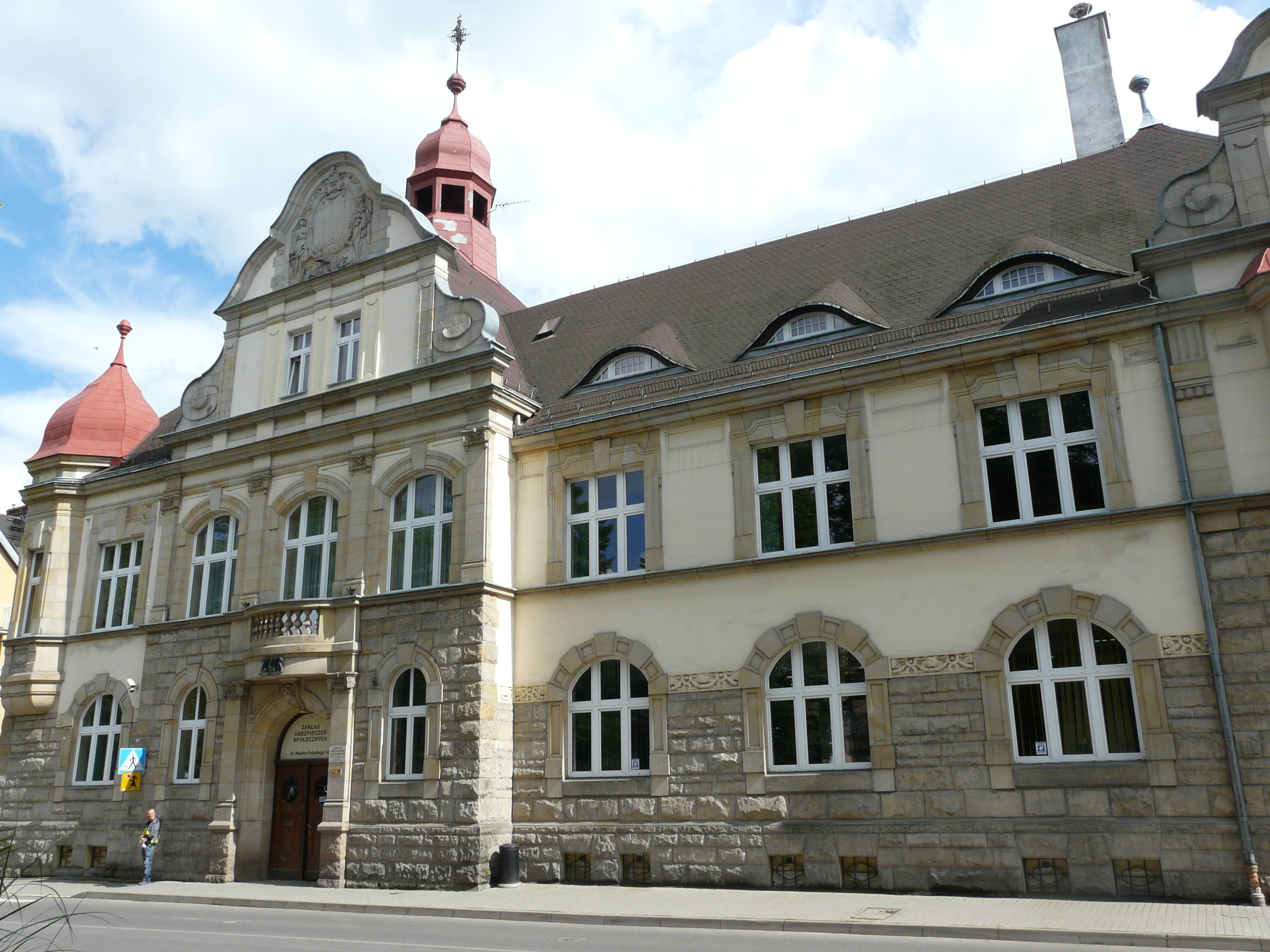
ZUS office

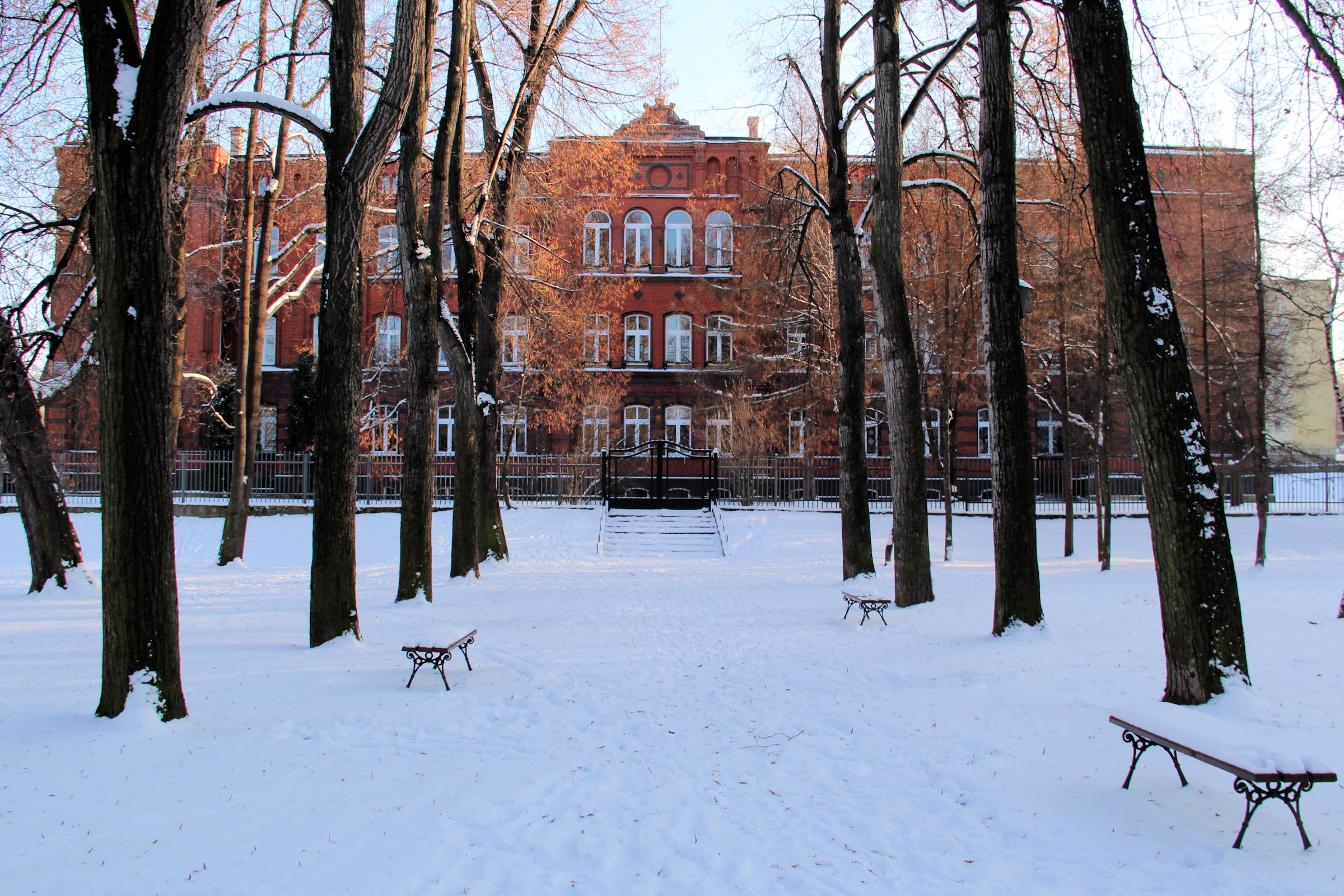
High school (Liceum ogólnokształcące)

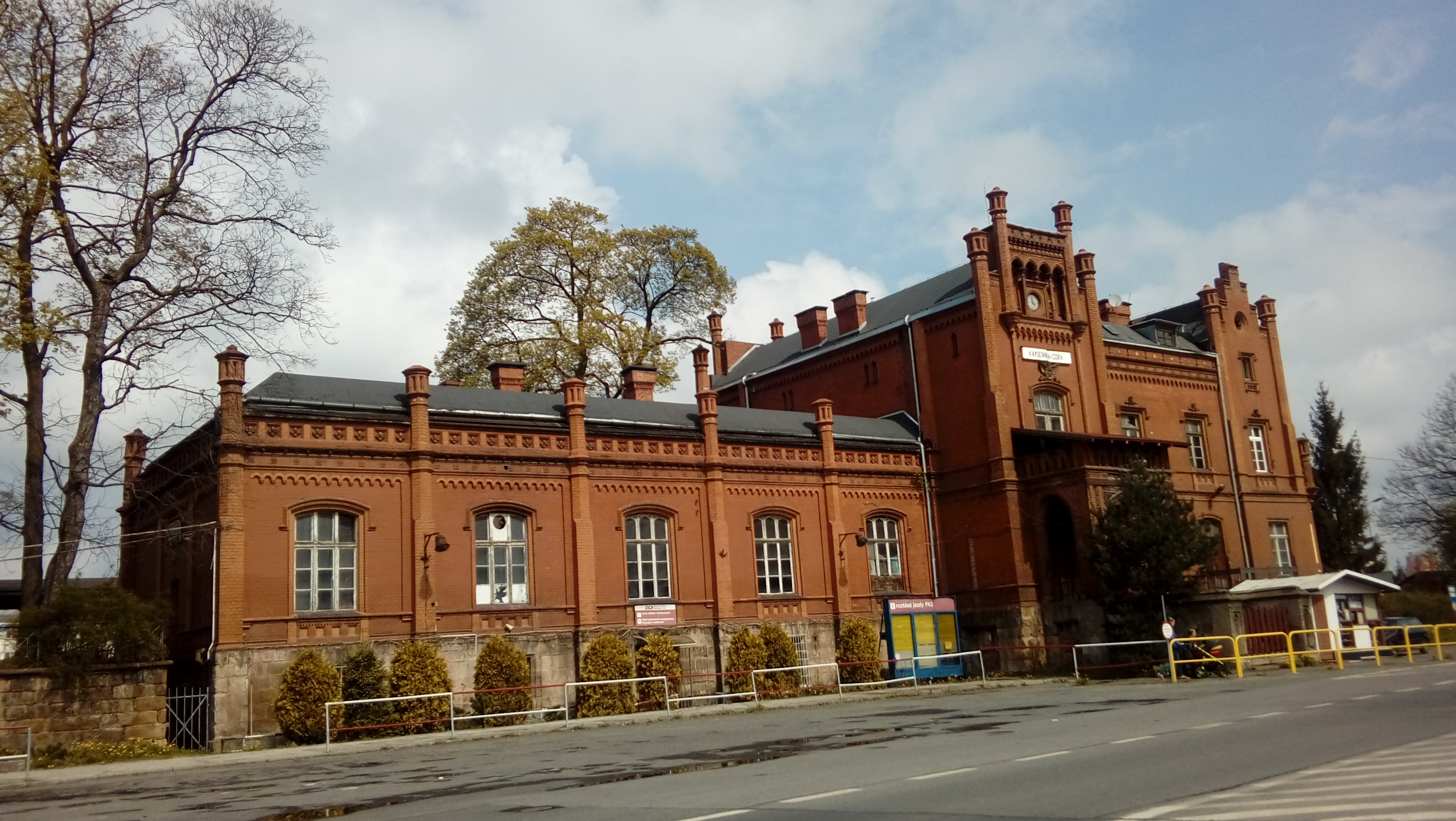
Train station

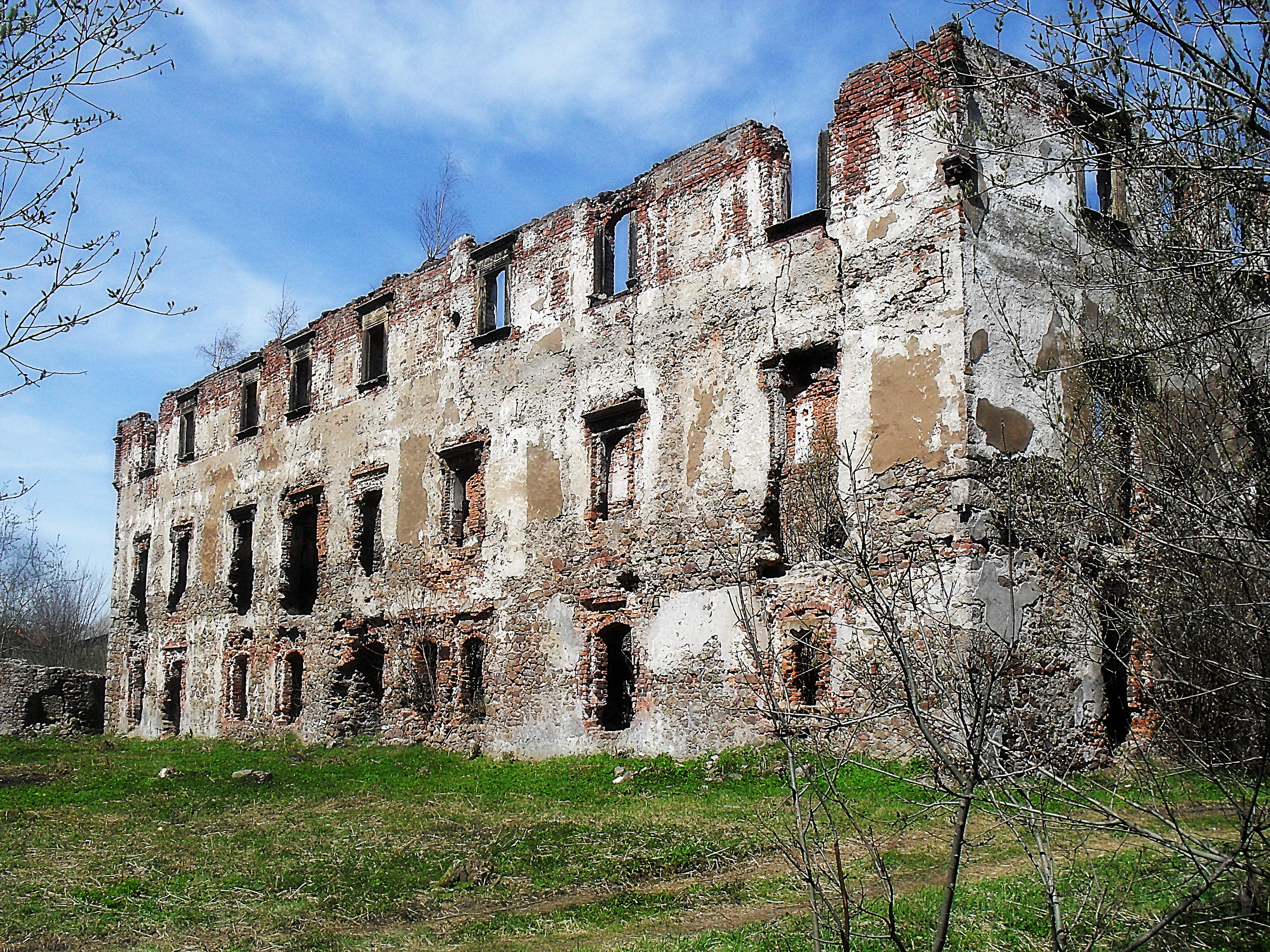
Grodztwo Castle ruins

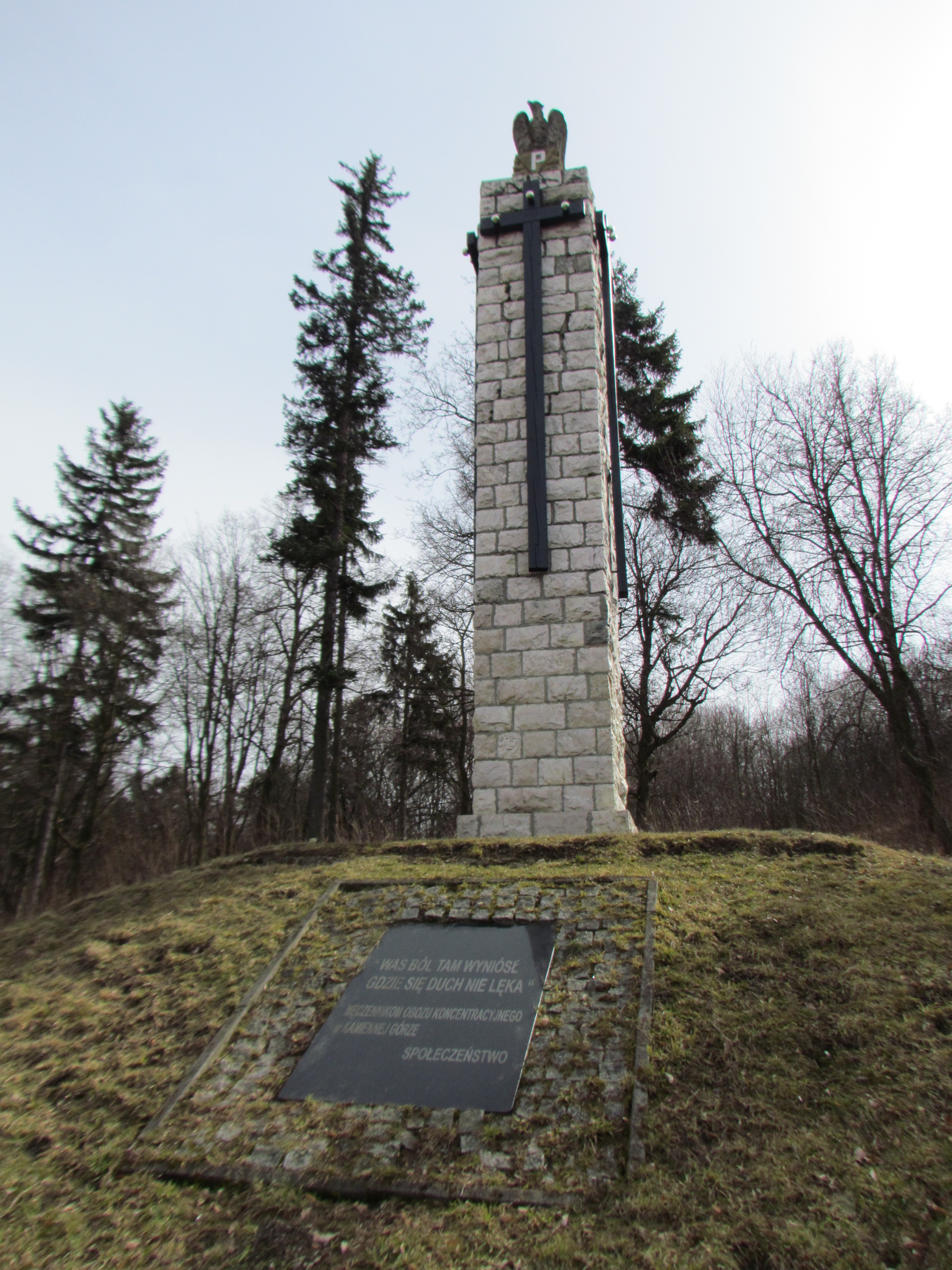
Memorial to murdered prisoners of the local branch of the Nazi German Gross-Rosen concentration camp

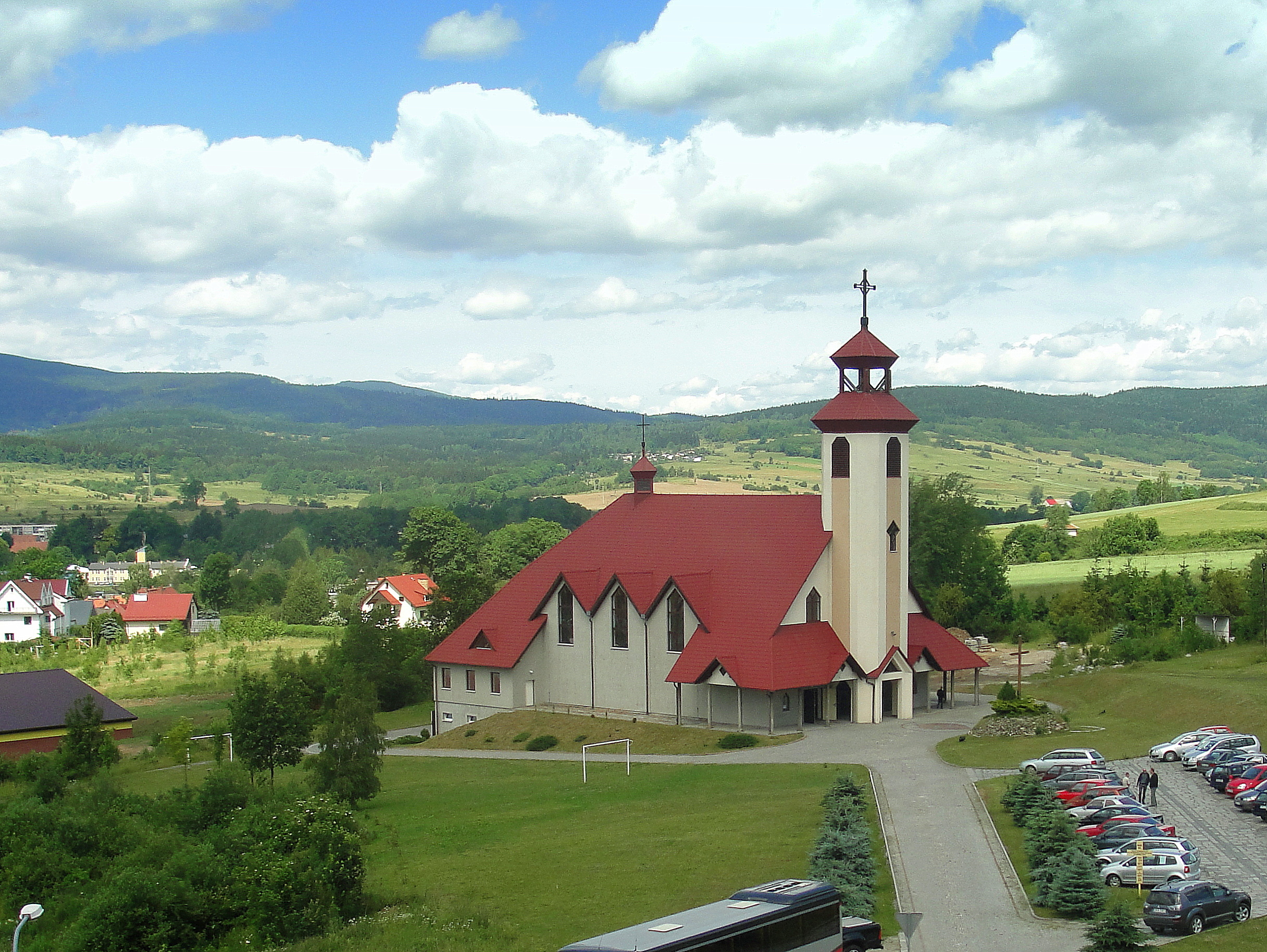
Sacred Heart of Jesus Church

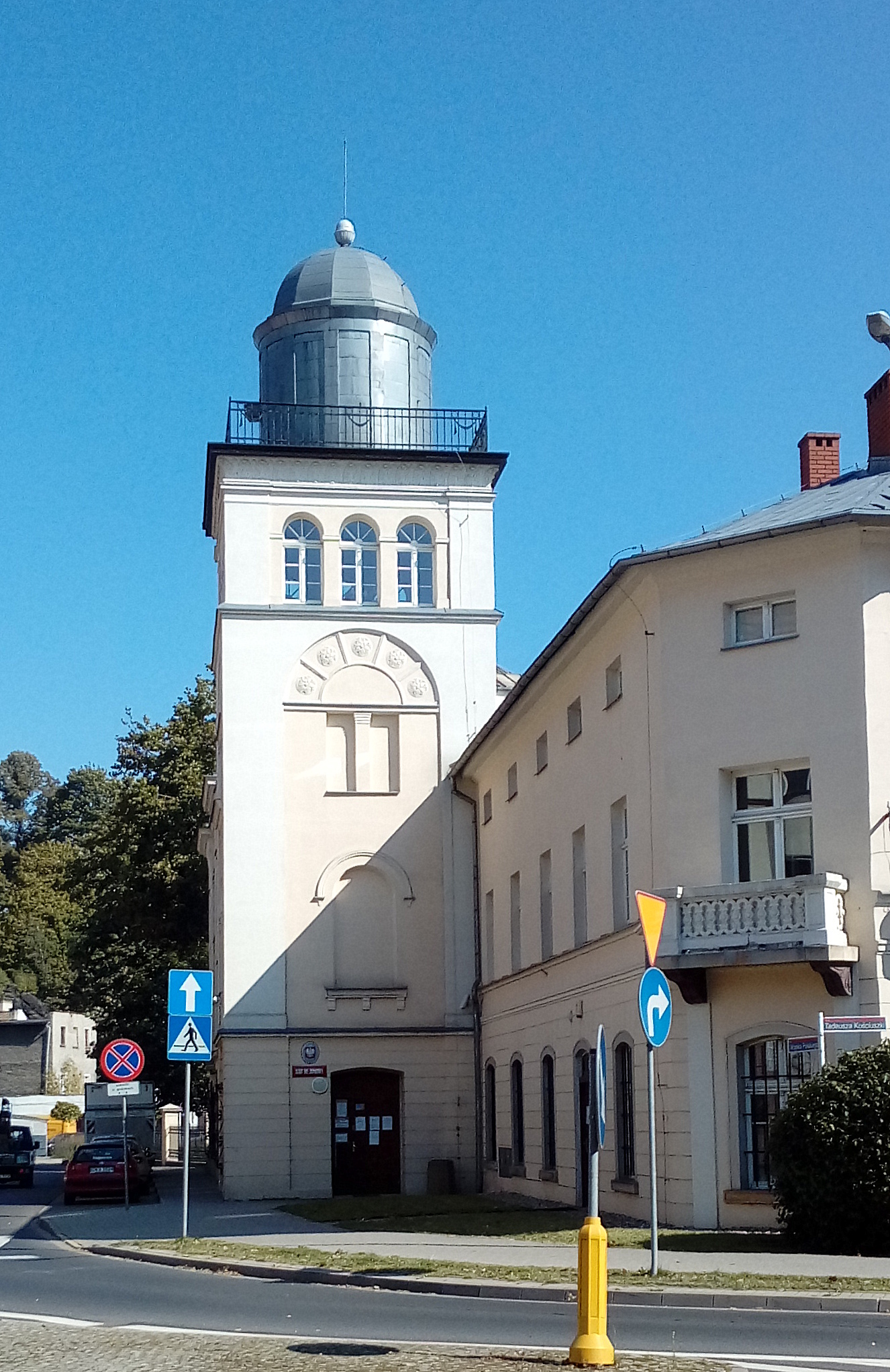
Courthouse

== Notable people ==
- Carl Gotthard Langhans (1732–1808), architect, designer of the Brandenburg Gate
- Walter Arndt (1891–1944), zoologist
- Viktor Hamburger (1900–2001), biologist
- Rudolf Hamburger (1903–1980), architect and spy
- Gosia Dobrowolska (born 1958), actress
- Damian Dąbrowski (born 1992), Polish professional footballer

== Twin towns – sister cities ==
Kamienna Góra is twinned with:

- Bitterfeld-Wolfen, Germany
- Dvůr Králové nad Labem, Czech Republic
- Ikast-Brande, Denmark
- Trutnov, Czech Republic
- Vierzon, France
- Wolfenbüttel, Germany
