= Western Sudetes =

Mountain range in Europe

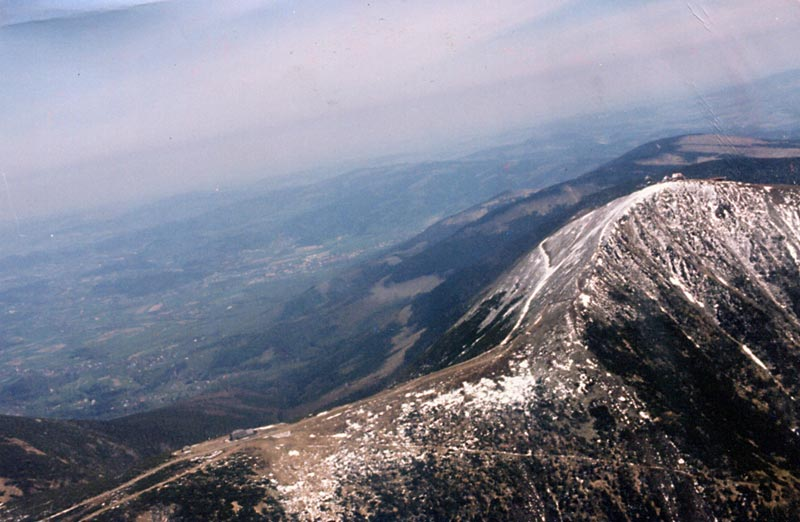
- The Giant Mountains, Sněžka

Highest point
- Peak: Sněžka
- Elevation: 1,603 m (5,259 ft)
- Coordinates: 50°44′10″N 15°44′24″E

Geography
- Divisions of the Sudetes subprovince, Western Sudetes marked in red
- Countries: Czech Republic, Germany and Poland
- Regions: Ústí nad Labem, Liberec, Hradec Králové (Czech Rep.), Saxony (Germany) and Lower Silesia (Poland)
- Parent range: Sudetes

The Western Sudetes (Polish: Sudety Zachodnie; Czech: Krkonošská oblast; German: Westsudeten) are a geomorphological macroregion, the western part of the Sudetes subprovince on the borders of the Czech Republic, Poland and Germany.

== Geography ==
They are formed mostly by mountain ranges. They stretch from the Bóbr river in the east to the Elbe and the Elbe Sandstone Mountains in the west.

The Western Sudetes includes the Giant Mountains, which is the highest mountain range in the Czech Republic. All the highest mountains of the Western Sudetes are located in this mountain range. The highest peak is the Sněžka at 1,603 m (5,259 ft).

== Divisions ==
The Western Sudetes are divided into following mesoregions (number indicates its location on the infobox map):

Number	Name	Location	Highest point
1	West Lusatian Hill Country and Uplands	DE	449 m (1,473 ft) (Hochstein)
2	Upper Lusatian Gefilde	DE	340 m (1,120 ft) (nameless hill)
3	Lusatian Highlands	CZ, DE	608 m (1,995 ft) (Hrazený)
4	Zittau Basin	DE, PL, CZ	593 m (1,946 ft) (Prosečský hřeben)
5	Lusatian Mountains	CZ, DE	793 m (2,602 ft) (Lausche/Luž)
6	Jizera Foothills	PL, CZ	572 m (1,877 ft) (Andělský vrch)
7	Jizera Mountains	CZ, PL	1,127 m (3,698 ft) (Wysoka Kopa)
8	Ještěd–Kozákov Ridge	CZ	1,012 m (3,320 ft) (Ještěd)
9	Kaczawskie Foothills	PL	501 m (1,644 ft) (Ostrzyca)
10	Kaczawskie Mountains	PL	725 m (2,379 ft) (Okole)
11	Jelenia Góra Valley	PL	376 m (1,234 ft) (Krzywousty)
12	Rudawy Janowickie	PL	945 m (3,100 ft) (Skalnik)
13	Giant Mountains	CZ, PL	1,603 m (5,259 ft) (Sněžka)
14	Giant Mountains Foothills	CZ	835 m (2,740 ft) (Hejlov)
15	Waldenburg Highlands	PL	515 m (1,690 ft) (Sas)
