= Sudeten =

Sudeten may refer to:

- Sudetes, central Europe
- Sudetenland, former region of Czechoslovakia
- Sudeten Germans, German-speakers from Sudetenland
