= Kaczawskie Mountains =

Mountain range in south-western Poland

Coordinates: 50.963056°N 15.846944°E

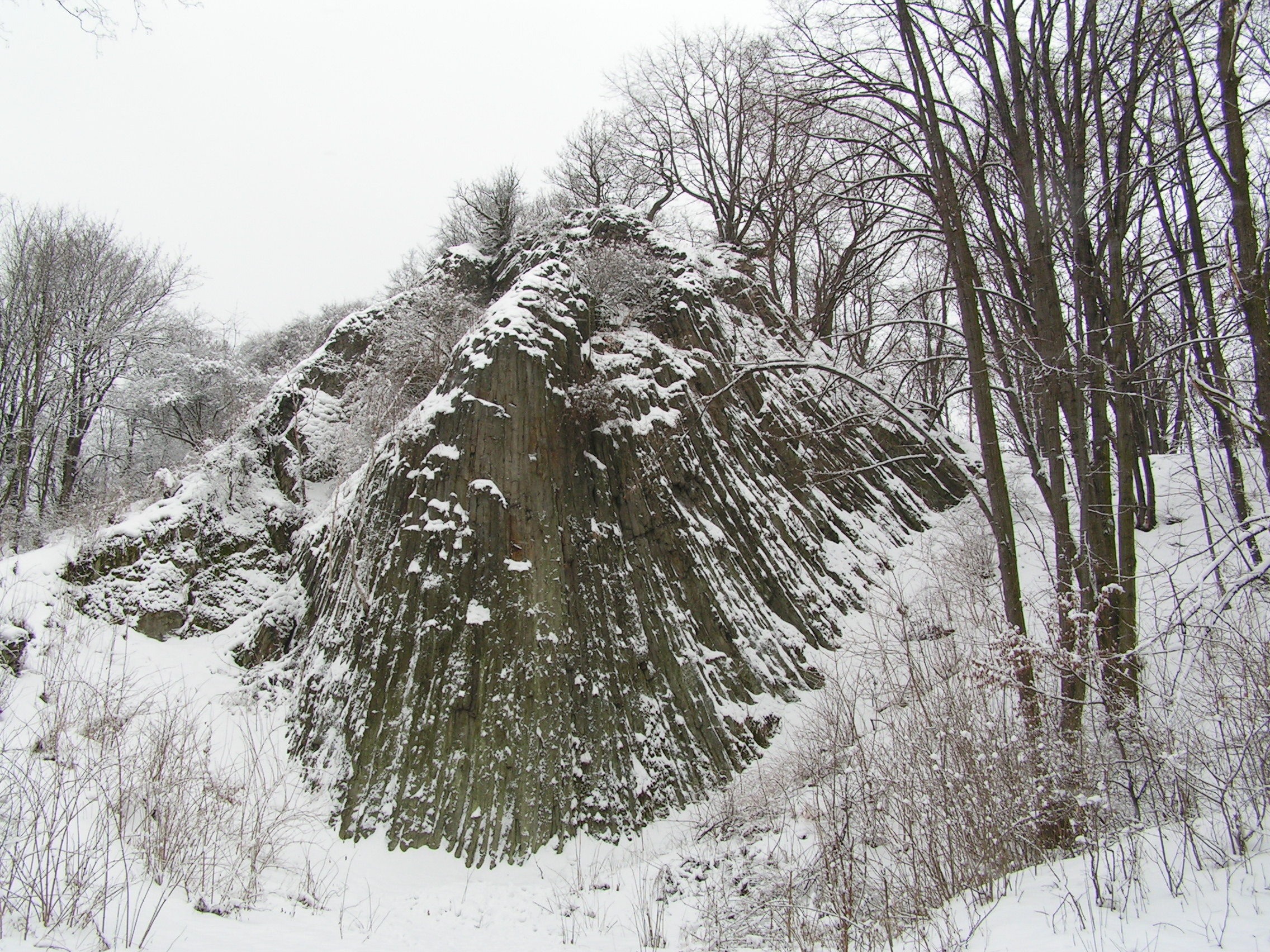
- Małe Organy Myśliborskie lava formation in the Kaczawskie Mountains

Highest point
- Peak: Skopiec
- Elevation: 719 m (2,359 ft)

Dimensions
- Length: 30 km (19 mi)

Geography
- Country: Poland
- Voivodeship: Lower Silesian
- Parent range: Western Sudetes

The Kaczawskie Mountains (Polish: Góry Kaczawskie; Czech: Kačavské hory) or Katzbach Mountains (German: Bober-Katzbach-Gebirge) are a mountain range in the Lower Silesian Voivodeship of Poland. It is roughly 30 kilometres long and belongs to the Western Sudetes. Its highest peak is the Skopiec (719 m). To the north of the Kaczawskie Mountains are the Kaczawskie Foothills.

== Location ==
The ridge, which runs from northwest to southeast at heights between 400 and 700 metres, is a fold mountain range consisting of limestone, slate and dolomite. In the west the Bóbr separates the range from the Jizera Mountains and Jizera Foreland; to the north are the Kaczawskie Foothills; to the east the Raging Neisse forms the boundary. In the southeast, the Kaczawskie Mountains merge into the Wałbrzych Mountains. To the south, the Rudawy Janowickie and Jelenia Góra Valley form the transition to the Giant Mountains.
