= Sudetes =

Mountain range in Germany, Poland and the Czech Republic

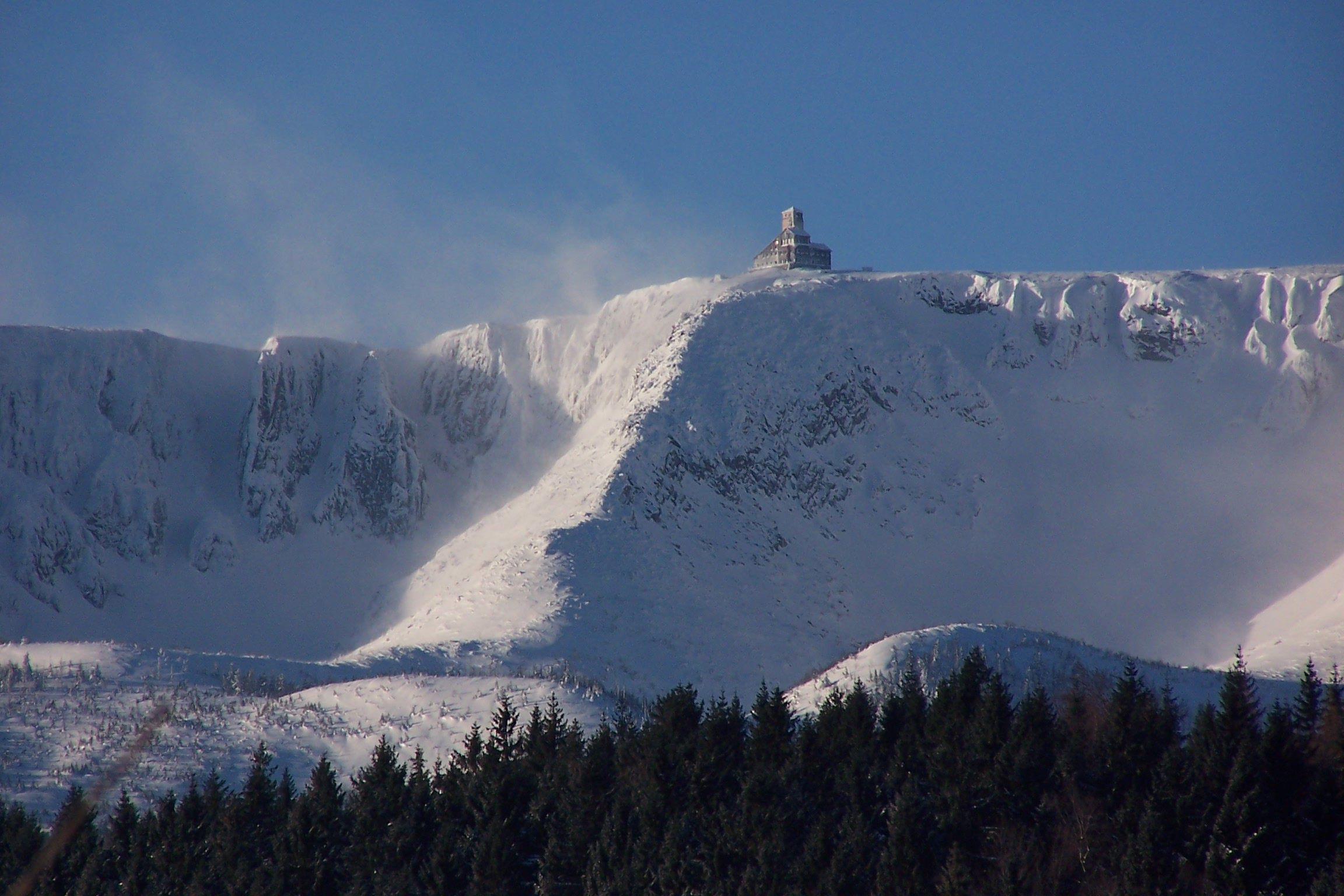
- Śnieżne Kotły in the Karkonosze National Park

Highest point
- Peak: Sněžka
- Elevation: 1,603 m (5,259 ft)
- Coordinates: 50°44′10″N 15°44′24″E

Dimensions
- Length: 300 km (190 mi)

Naming
- Native name: Krkonošsko-jesenická subprovincie (Czech); Sudeten (German); Sudety (Polish); Sudety (Upper Sorbian)

Geography
- Location within Europe

- Divisions of the Sudetes
- Countries: Czech Republic; Poland; Germany
- Regions/Voivodeships: Ústí nad Labem; Liberec; Hradec Králové; Pardubice; Olomouc; Moravian-Silesian; Lower Silesian; Opole; Saxony
- Range coordinates: 50°30′N 16°00′E

Geology
- Orogenies: Variscan orogeny (assembly); Alpine orogeny (uplift)

The Sudetes (/suːˈdiːtiːz/ soo-DEE-teez), also known as the Sudeten Mountains or Sudetic Mountains, is a geomorphological subprovince of the Bohemian Massif province in Central Europe, shared by the Czech Republic, Poland and Germany. They consist mainly of mountain ranges and are the highest part of the Bohemian Massif. They stretch from the Saxon capital of Dresden in the northwest across to the region of Lower Silesia in Poland and to the city of Ostrava in the Czech Republic in the east. Geographically the Sudetes are a Mittelgebirge with some characteristics typical of high mountains. Its plateaus and subtle summit relief makes the Sudetes more akin to mountains of Northern Europe than to the Alps.

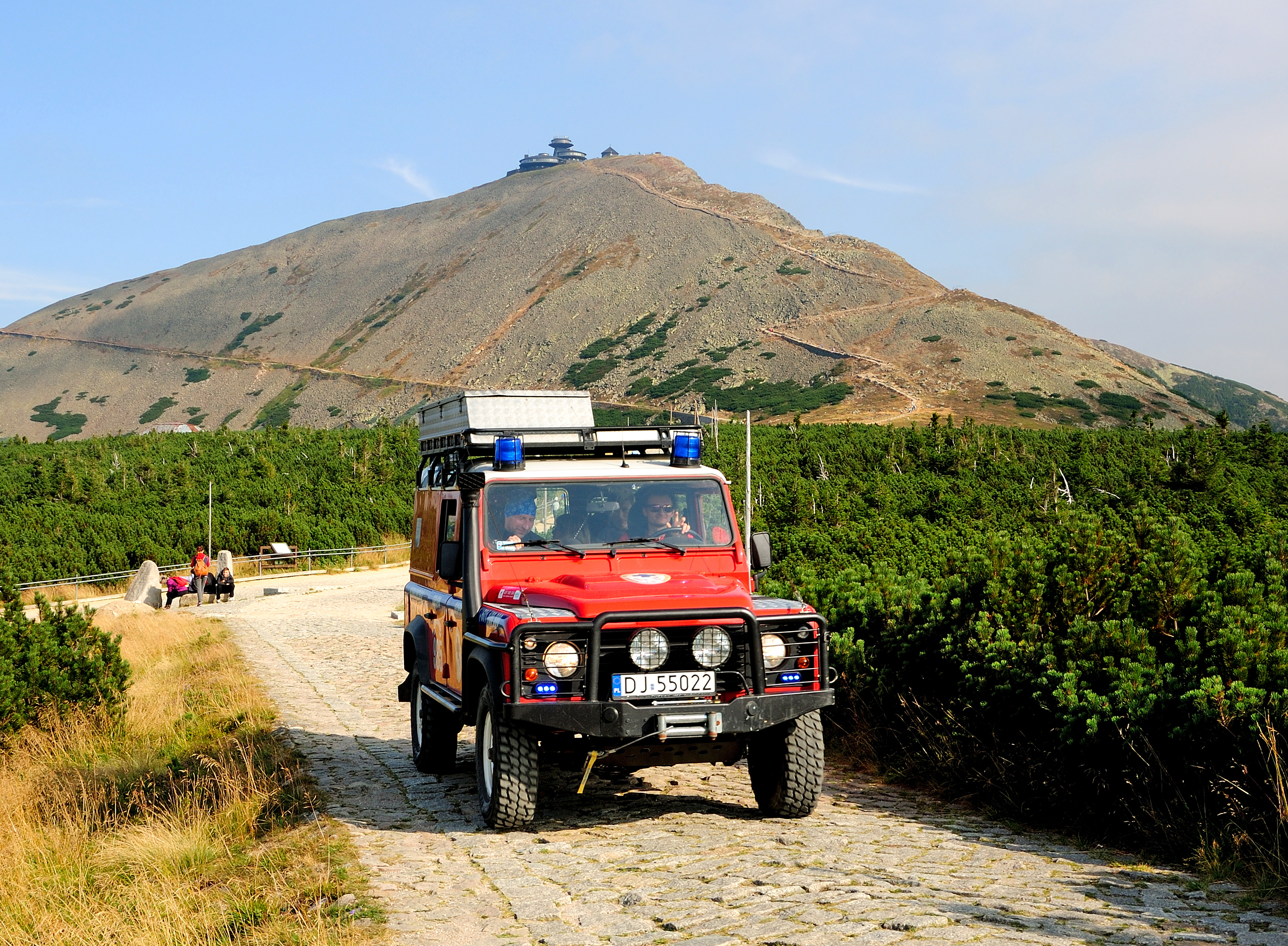
Sněžka

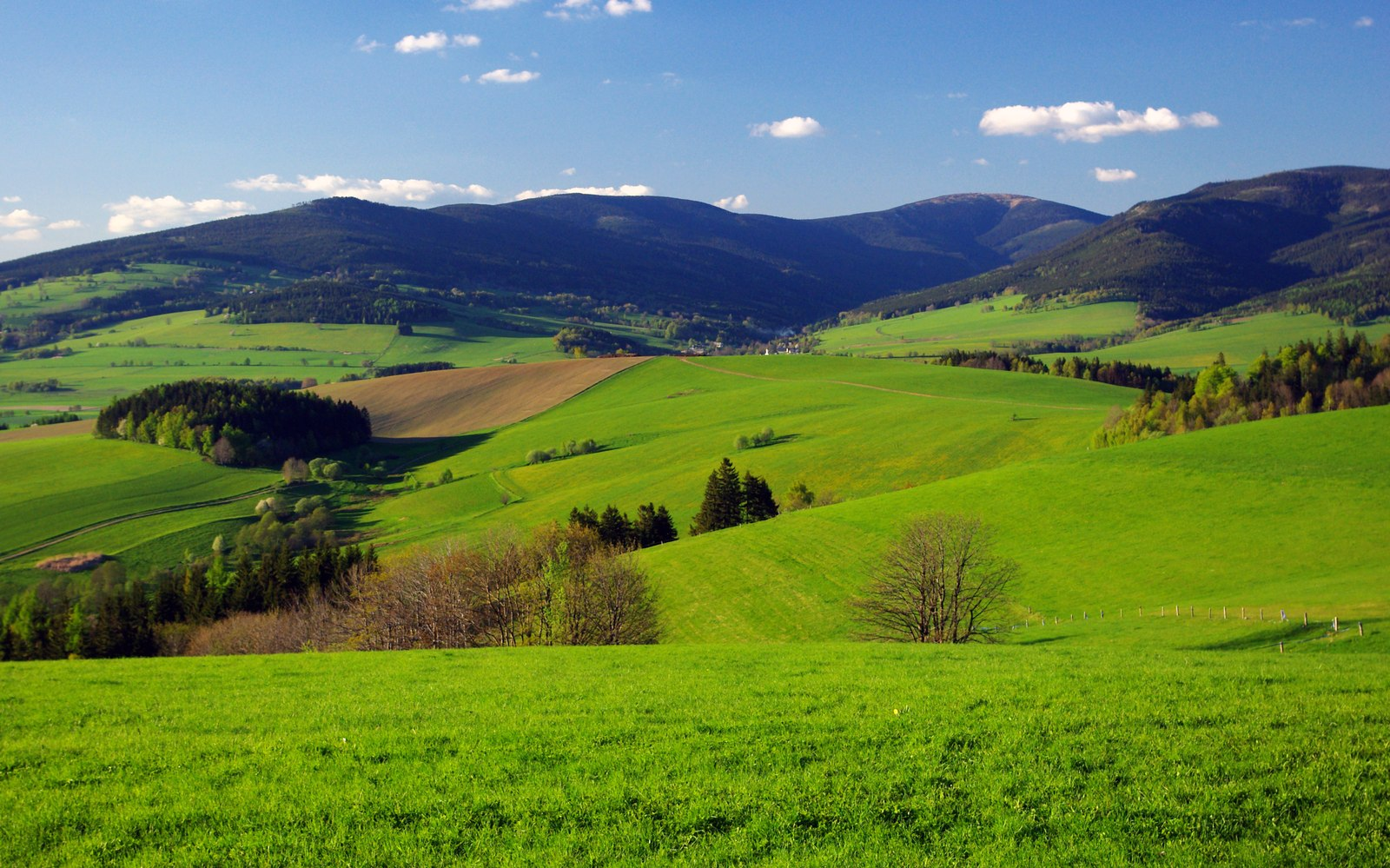
Králický Sněžník

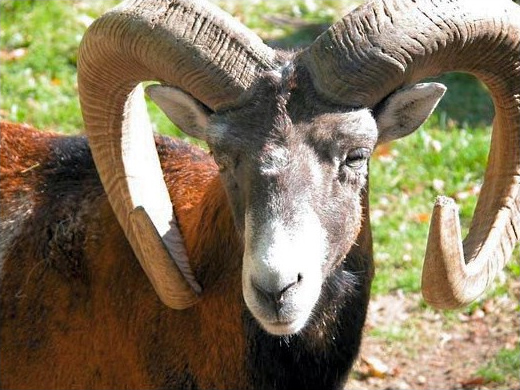
Mouflon

In the east of the Sudetes, the Moravian Gate and Ostrava Basin separates from the Carpathian Mountains. The Sudetes' highest mountain is Sněžka (Polish: Śnieżka) at 1,603 m (5,259 ft), which is also the highest mountain of the Czech Republic, Bohemia, Silesia, and Lower Silesian Voivodeship. It lies in the Giant Mountains on the border between the Czech Republic and Poland. Praděd (1,491 m/4,893 ft) in the Hrubý Jeseník mountains is the highest mountain of Moravia. Lusatia's highest point (1,072 m/3,517 ft) lies on Smrk mountain in the Jizera Mountains, and the Sudetes' highest mountain in Germany, which is also the country's highest mountain east of the river Elbe, is Lausche (793 m/2,600 ft) in the Lusatian Mountains. The most notable rivers rising in the Sudetes are the Elbe, Oder, Spree, Morava, Bóbr, Lusatian Neisse, Eastern Neisse, Jizera and Kwisa. The highest parts of the Sudetes are protected by national parks; Karkonosze and Stołowe in Poland and Krkonoše in the Czech Republic.

In the west, the Sudetes border with the Elbe Sandstone Mountains. The westernmost point of the Sudetes lies in the Dresden Heath (Dresdner Heide), the westernmost part of the West Lusatian Hill Country and Uplands, in Dresden.

The Sudeten Germans (the German-speaking inhabitants of Czechoslovakia) as well as the Sudetenland (the border regions of Bohemia, Moravia, and Czech Silesia they inhabited) are named after the Sudetes.

== Etymology ==
The name Sudetes is derived from Sudeti montes, a Latinization of the name Soudeta ore used in the Geographia by the Greco-Roman writer Ptolemy (Book 2, Chapter 10) c. AD 150 for a range of mountains in Germania in the general region of the modern Czech Republic.

There is no consensus about which mountains he meant, and he could for example have intended the Ore Mountains, joining the modern Sudetes to their west, or even (according to Schütte) the Bohemian Forest (although this is normally considered to be equivalent to Ptolemy's Gabreta forest). The modern Sudetes are probably Ptolemy's Askiburgion mountains. It has also been proposed that Ptolemy's Askiburgion and Sudeti are the same mountains, with one being measured from the north, and one from the south.

Ptolemy wrote "Σούδητα" in Greek, which is a neuter plural. Latin mons, however, is a masculine, hence Sudeti. The Latin version, and the modern geographical identification, is likely to be a scholastic innovation, as it is not attested in classical Latin literature. The meaning of the name is not known. In one hypothetical derivation, it means Mountains of Wild Boars, relying on Indo-European *su-, "pig". A better etymology perhaps is from Latin sudis, plural sudes, "spines", which can be used of spiny fish or spiny terrain.

== Subdivisions ==
The Sudetes are usually divided into the following mesoregions:

Macroregion	Name	Native name	Highest peak	Height
Western Sudetes	West Lusatian Foothills	Westlausitzer Hügel- und Bergland (DE)	Hochstein	449 m (1,473 ft)
Western Sudetes	Lusatian Gefilde	Oberlausitzer Gefilde (DE)	Valtenberg	587 m (1,926 ft)
Western Sudetes	Zittau Basin	Östliche Oberlausitz (DE); Kotlina Żytawska (PL); Žitavská pánev (CZ)	Prosečský hřeben	593 m (1,946 ft)
Western Sudetes	Lusatian Highlands	Šluknovská pahorkatina (CZ); Lausitzer Bergland (DE)	Hrazený	608 m (1,995 ft)
Western Sudetes	Lusatian Mountains	Lužické hory (CZ); Lausitzer Gebirge (DE)	Lausche	793 m (2,602 ft)
Western Sudetes	Ještěd–Kozákov Ridge	Ještědsko-kozákovský hřbet (CZ)	Ještěd	1,012 m (3,320 ft)
Western Sudetes	Jizera Foothills	Pogórze Izerskie (PL); Frýdlantská pahorkatina (CZ)	Andělský vrch	572 m (1,877 ft)
Western Sudetes	Jizera Mountains	Jizerské hory (CZ); Góry Izerskie (PL)	Wysoka Kopa	1,127 m (3,698 ft)
Western Sudetes	Kaczawskie Foothills	Pogórze Kaczawskie (PL)	Ostrzyca	501 m (1,644 ft)
Western Sudetes	Kaczawskie Mountains	Góry Kaczawskie (PL)	Okole	725 m (2,379 ft)
Western Sudetes	Jelenia Góra Valley	Kotlina Jeleniogórska (PL)	Krzywousty	376 m (1,234 ft)
Western Sudetes	Rudawy Janowickie	Rudawy Janowickie (PL)	Skalnik	945 m (3,100 ft)
Western Sudetes	Giant Mountains	Krkonoše (CZ); Karkonosze (PL)	Sněžka	1,603 m (5,259 ft)
Western Sudetes	Giant Mountains Foothills	Krkonošské podhůří (CZ)	Hejlov	839 m (2,753 ft)
Western Sudetes	Wałbrzych Highlands	Pogórze Wałbrzyskie (PL)	Sas	515 m (1,690 ft)
Central Sudetes	Wałbrzych Mountains	Góry Wałbrzyskie (PL)	Borowa	853 m (2,799 ft)
Central Sudetes	Stone Mountains	Góry Kamienne (PL)	Waligóra	936 m (3,071 ft)
Central Sudetes	Broumov Highlands	Broumovská vrchovina (CZ)	Královecký Špičák	881 m (2,890 ft)
Central Sudetes	Owl Mountains	Góry Sowie (PL)	Wielka Sowa	1,015 m (3,330 ft)
Central Sudetes	Nowa Ruda Depression	Obniżenie Noworudzkie (PL)	Włodzicka Góra	757 m (2,484 ft)
Central Sudetes	Ścinawka Depression	Obniżenie Ścinawki (PL)	Gardzień	556 m (1,824 ft)
Central Sudetes	Stołowe Mountains	Góry Stołowe (PL); Stolové hory (CZ) (Note: Only a small part of the Stołowe Mountains extends into the Czech Republic. According to the geomorphological division of the Czech Republic, the area is not considered a separate mesoregion, but rather a part of the Broumov Highlands.)	Szczeliniec Wielki	919 m (3,015 ft)
Central Sudetes	Bardzkie Mountains	Góry Bardzkie (PL)	Szeroka Góra	765 m (2,510 ft)
Central Sudetes	Bystrzyckie Mountains	Góry Bystrzyckie (PL); Bystřické hory (CZ)	Jagodna	977 m (3,205 ft)
Central Sudetes	Orlické Mountains	Orlické hory (CZ); Góry Orlickie (PL)	Velká Deštná	1,115 m (3,658 ft)
Central Sudetes	Orlické Foothills	Podorlická pahorkatina (CZ); Pogórze Orlickie (PL)	Špičák	841 m (2,759 ft)
Central Sudetes	Kłodzko Valley	Kotlina Kłodzka (PL); Kladská kotlina (CZ)	Wapniarka	532 m (1,745 ft)
Sudeten Foreland	Strzegom Hills	Wzgórza Strzegomskie (PL)	Góra Krzyżowa	353 m (1,158 ft)
Sudeten Foreland	Sudeten Depression	Obniżenie Podsudeckie (PL)	Jabłoniec	316 m (1,037 ft)
Sudeten Foreland	Świdnicka Plain	Równina Świdnicka (PL)	Popiel	284 m (932 ft)
Sudeten Foreland	Ślęża Massif	Masyw Ślęży (PL)	Ślęża	718 m (2,356 ft)
Sudeten Foreland	Niemczańsko-Strzelińskie Hills	Wzgórza Niemczańsko-Strzelińskie (PL)	Brzeźnica	492 m (1,614 ft)
Sudeten Foreland	Otmuchów Depression	Obniżenie Otmuchowskie (PL)	Grzbietnik	312 m (1,024 ft)
Sudeten Foreland	Vidnava Lowland	Vidnavská nížina (CZ); Przedgórze Paczkowskie (PL)	contour line	351 m (1,152 ft)
Sudeten Foreland	Žulová Hilly Land	Žulovská pahorkatina (CZ)	Boží hora	527 m (1,729 ft)
Eastern Sudetes	Golden Mountains	Rychlebské hory (CZ); Góry Złote (PL)	Smrk	1,125 m (3,691 ft)
Eastern Sudetes	Králický Sněžník Mountains	Masyw Śnieżnika (PL); Králický Sněžník (CZ)	Králický Sněžník	1,425 m (4,675 ft)
Eastern Sudetes	Opawskie Mountains	Zlatohorská vrchovina (CZ); Góry Opawskie (PL)	Příčný vrch	975 m (3,199 ft)
Eastern Sudetes	Hrubý Jeseník	Hrubý Jeseník (CZ)	Praděd	1,491 m (4,892 ft)
Eastern Sudetes	Hanušovice Highlands	Hanušovická vrchovina (CZ)	Jeřáb	1,003 m (3,291 ft)
Eastern Sudetes	Mohelnice Depression	Mohelnická brázda (CZ)	Homůlka	333 m (1,093 ft)
Eastern Sudetes	Zábřeh Highlands	Zábřežská vrchovina (CZ)	Lázek	715 m (2,346 ft)
Eastern Sudetes	Nízký Jeseník	Nízký Jeseník (CZ)	Slunečná	802 m (2,631 ft)

High Sudetes (Polish: Wysokie Sudety, Czech: Vysoké Sudety, German: Hochsudeten) is together name for the ranges of Giant Mountains, Hrubý Jeseník and Králický Sněžník Mountains.

== Climate ==
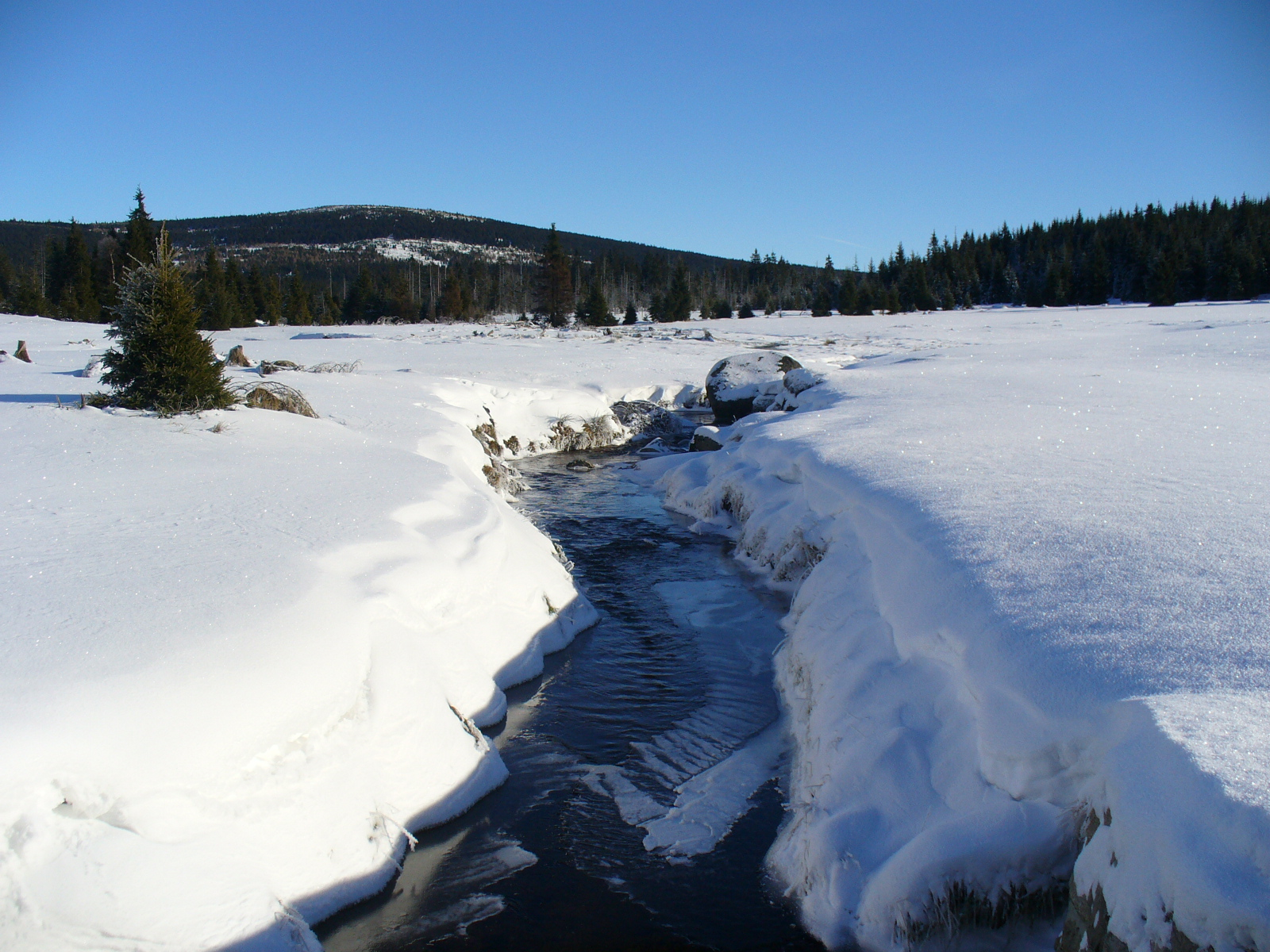
Hala Izerska (Polish Pole of Cold) in the Jizera Mountains

The highest mountains, those located along the Czech–Polish border have annual precipitations around 1,500 millimetres (59 in). The Table Mountains, which reach 919 metres (3,015 ft) in elevation, have precipitations ranging from 750 millimetres (30 in) at lower locations to 920 millimetres (36 in) in the upper parts, with July being the rainiest month. Snow cover at the Table Mountains typically last 70 to 95 days depending on altitude.

== Vegetation ==
Settlement, logging and clearance has left forest pockets in the foothills with dense and continuous forest being found in the upper parts of the mountains. Due to logging in the last centuries little remains of the broad-leaf trees like beech, sycamore, ash and littleleaf linden that were once common in the Sudetes. Instead Norway spruce was planted in their place in the early 19th century, in some places amounting to monocultures. To provide more space for spruce plantations various peatlands were drained in the 19th and 20th century. Some spruce plantations have suffered severe damage as the seeds used came from lowland specimens that were not adapted to mountain conditions. Silver fir grow naturally in the Sudetes being more widespread in past times, before clearance since the Late Middle Ages and subsequent industrial pollution reduced the stands.

Many arctic-alpine and alpine vascular plants have a disjunct distribution being notably absent from the central Sudetes despite suitable habitats. Possibly this is the result a warm period during the Holocene (last 10,000 years) which wiped out cold-adapted vascular plants in the medium-sized mountains of the central Sudetes where there was no higher ground that could serve as refugia. (Note: Not to be confused with a glacial refugium.) Besides altitude the distribution of some alpine plants is influenced by soil. This is the case of Aster alpinus that grows preferentially on calcareous ground. Other alpine plants such as Cardamine amara, Epilobium anagallidifolium, Luzula sudetica and Solidago virgaurea occur beyond their altitudinal zonation in very humid areas.

Peatlands are common in the mountains occurring on high plateaus or in valley bottoms. Fens occur at slopes.

=== Timber line ===
The higher mountains of the Sudetes lie above the timber line which is made up of Norway spruce. Spruces in wind-exposed areas display features such as flag tree disposition of branches, tilted stems and elongated stem cross sections. Forest-free areas above the timber line have increased historically by deforestation yet lowering of the timber line by human activity is minimal. Areas above the timber line appear discontinuously as "islands" in the Sudetes. In the Giant Mountains the timber line lies at c. 1230 m a.s.l. while to the southeast in the Hrubý Jeseník mountains it lie at c. 1310 m a.s.l. Part of the Hrubý Jeseník mountains have been above the timber line for no less than 5000 years. Mountains rise considerably above the timber line, at most 400 m, a characteristic that sets the Sudetes apart from other Mittelgebirge of Central Europe.

== Geology ==
Geological research has been hampered by the multinational geography of the Sudetes with and the limitation of studies to state boundaries. (Note: Alfred Jahn's geomorphological studies of the Polish Sudetes in 1953 and 1980 exemplify this.)

=== Bedrock ===
Reconstruction of the Old Red Continent against which the terranes or "building blocks" of the Sudetes collided in Late Paleozoic times. The area of present-day Sudetes lies near the eastern end of Avalonia.

The igneous and metamorphic rocks of the Sudetes originated during the Variscan orogeny and its aftermath. The Sudetes are the northeasternmost accessible part of Variscan orogen as in the North European Plain the orogen is buried beneath sediments. Plate tectonic movements during the Variscan orogeny assembled together four major and two to three lesser tectonostratigraphic terranes. (Note: Geologist Tom McCann lists the main Variscan terranes that make up much of the Sudetes as the Moldanubian, Góry-Sowie-Klodzko, Teplá Barriandian, Lusatia-Izera terrane, Brunovistulian terrane. The first three lie in the central Sudetes while the last two in the west and central Sudetes.) The assemblage of the terranes ought to have involved the closure of at least two ocean basins containing oceanic crust and marine sediments. This is reflected in the ophiolites, MORB-basalts, blueschists and eclogites that occur in-between terranes. Various terranes of the Sudetes are likely extensions of the Armorican terrane while other terranes may be the fringes of the ancient Baltica continent. One possibility for the amalgamation of terranes in the Sudetes is that the Góry Sowie-Kłodzko terrane collided with the Orlica-Śnieżnik terrane causing the closure of a small oceanic basin. This event led to obduction of the Central Sudetic ophiolite in the Devonian period. In the Early Carboniferous the joint Góry Sowie-Kłodzko-Orlica-Śnieżnik terrane collided with the Brunovistulian terrane. This last terrane was part of the Old Red Continent and could correspond either to Baltica or the eastern tip of the narrow Avalonia terrane. Also by the Early Carboniferous the Saxothuringian terrane collided with the Góry Sowie-Kłodzko-Orlica-Śnieżnik terrane closing the Rheic Ocean.

Once the main phase of deformation of the orogeny was over basins that had formed in-between metamorphic rock massifs were filled by sedimentary rock in the Devonian and Carboniferous periods. During and after sedimentation large granitic plutons intruded the crust. Viewed in a map today these plutons make up about 15% the Sudetes. Granites are of S-type. The granites and grantic-gneisses of Izera in the west Sudetes are disassociated from orogeny and thought to have formed during rifting along a passive continental margin. (Note: Contrary to this case S-type granites are typically thought to come into existence concurrently or slightly after orogeny.) The Karkonosze Granite, also in the west Sudetes, have been dated to have formed c. 318 million years ago at the beginning of the Variscan orogeny. The Karkonosze Granite is intruded by somewhat younger lamprophyre dykes.

A NW-SE to WNW-ESE oriented strike-slip fault —the Intra-Sudetic fault— runs through the length of the Sudetes. The Intra-Sudetic fault is parallel with the Upper Elbe fault and Middle Oder fault. Other main faults at the sudetes are also NW-SE oriented, dextral and of strike slip type. These include the Tłumaczów-Sienna Fault and the Marginal Sudetic Fault.

=== Volcanism and thermal waters ===
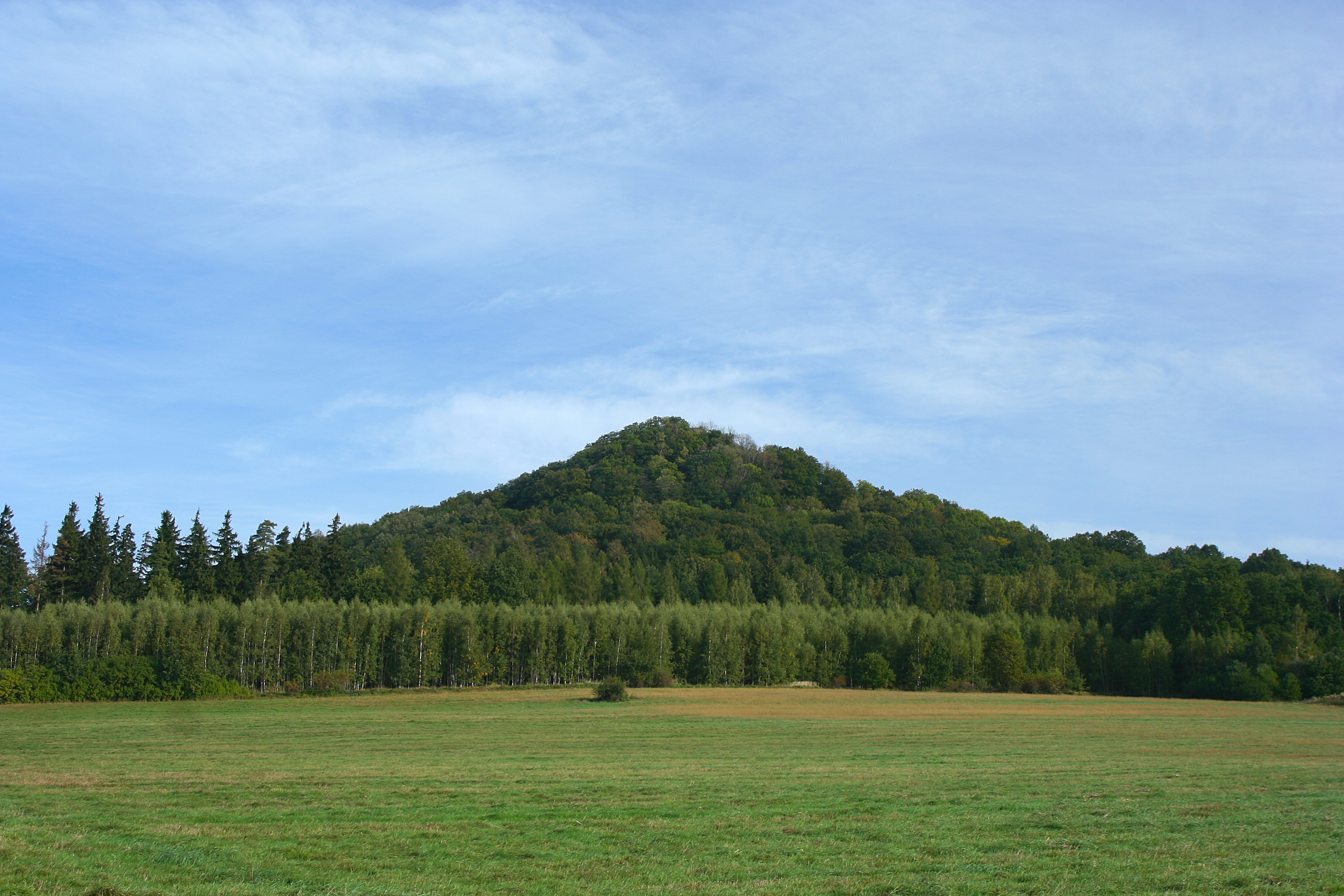
Ostrzyca, an eroded volcano in the northern Sudetes

There are remnants of lava flows and volcanic plugs in the Sudetes. The volcanic rocks making up these outcrops are of mafic chemistry and include basanite and represent episodes of volcanism in the Oligocene and Miocene periods. (Note: Some volcanic rocks may be as young as of Early Pliocene age.) Volcanism affected not only the Sudetes but also parts of the Sudetic foreland being part of a SW-NE oriented Bohemo-Silesian Belt of volcanic rocks. Mantle xenoliths have been recovered from the lavas of a volcano at Ještěd-Kozákov Ridge in the Czech western Sudetes. These pyroxenite xenoliths arrived to surface from approximate depths of 35, 70 and 73 km and indicate a complex history for the mantle beneath the Sudetes.

There are thermal springs in the Sudetes with measured temperatures of 29 to 44 °C. Drilling has revealed the existence of waters at 87 °C at depths of 2000 m. These modern waters are believed to be associated to the Late Cenozoic volcanism in Central Europe.

=== Uplift and landforms ===
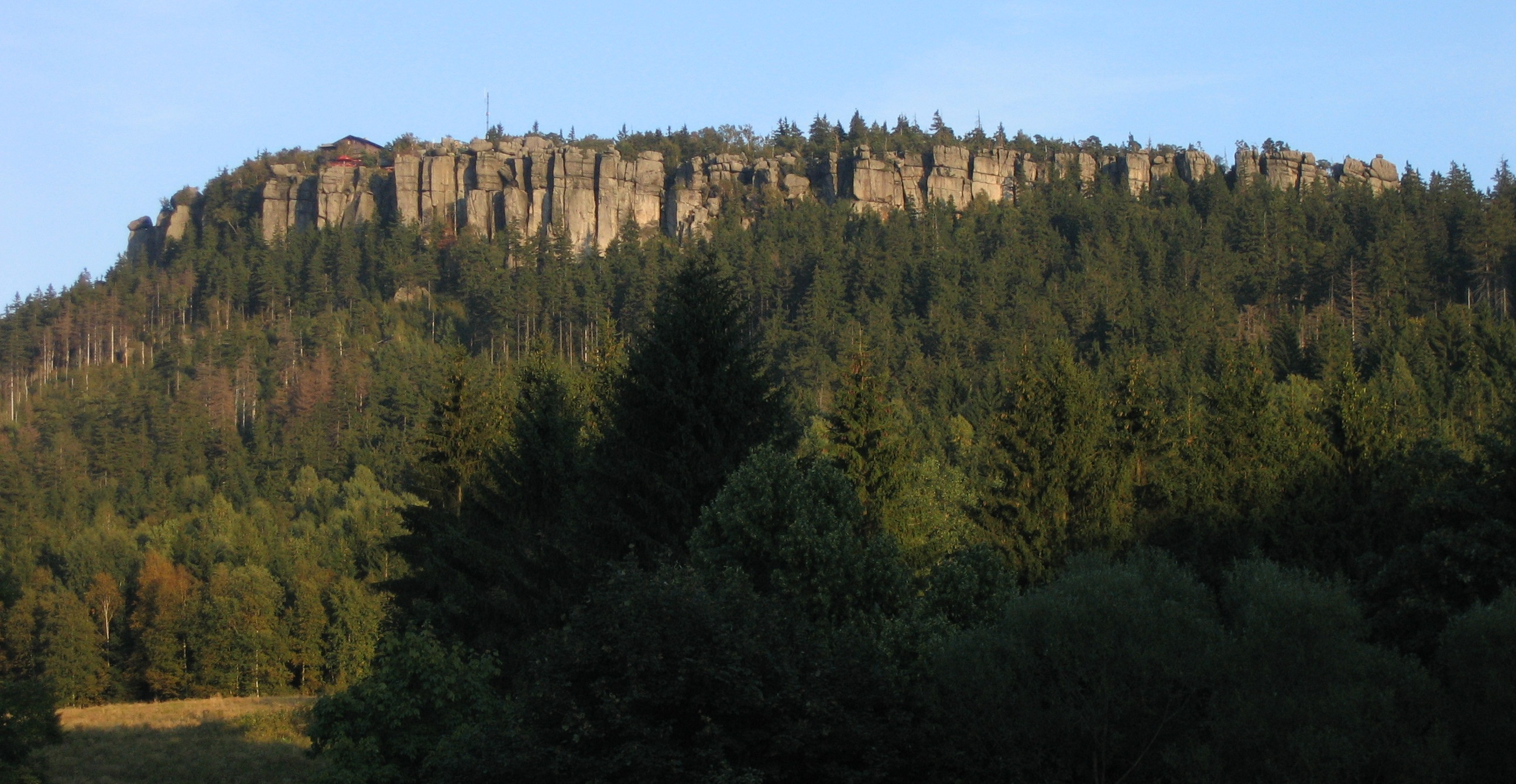
Escarpment at Szczeliniec Wielki, Table Mountains

The Sudetes forms the NE border of the Bohemian Massif. In detail the Sudetes is made up of a series of massifs that are rectangular and rhomboid in plan view. These mountains corresponds to horsts and domes separated by basins, including grabens. The mountains took their present form after the Late Mesozoic retreat of the seas from the area which left the Sudetes subject to denudation for at least 65 million years. This meant that during the Late Cretaceous and Early Cenozoic 8 to 4 km of rock was eroded from the top of what is now the Sudetes. Concurrently with the Cenozoic denudation the climate cooled due to the northward drift of Europe. The collision between Africa and Europe has resulted in the deformation and uplift of the Sudetes. As such the uplift is related to the contemporary rise of the Alps and Carpathians. (Note: Fission track dating yields various possibilities about the Late Cenozoic uplift of the Sudetes. Possibly the last uplift pulse begun 7 to 5 million years ago.) The acceleration of uplift of the Sudetes occurred during the Middle Miocene because of the Bohemian Massif's growth. Uplift was accomplished by the creation or reactivation of numerous faults leading to a reshaping of the relief by renewed erosion. Various "hanging valleys" attest to this uplift. Block tectonics has uplifted or sunken crustal blocks. While the Late Cenozoic uplift has uplifted the Sudetes as a whole some grabens precede this uplift.

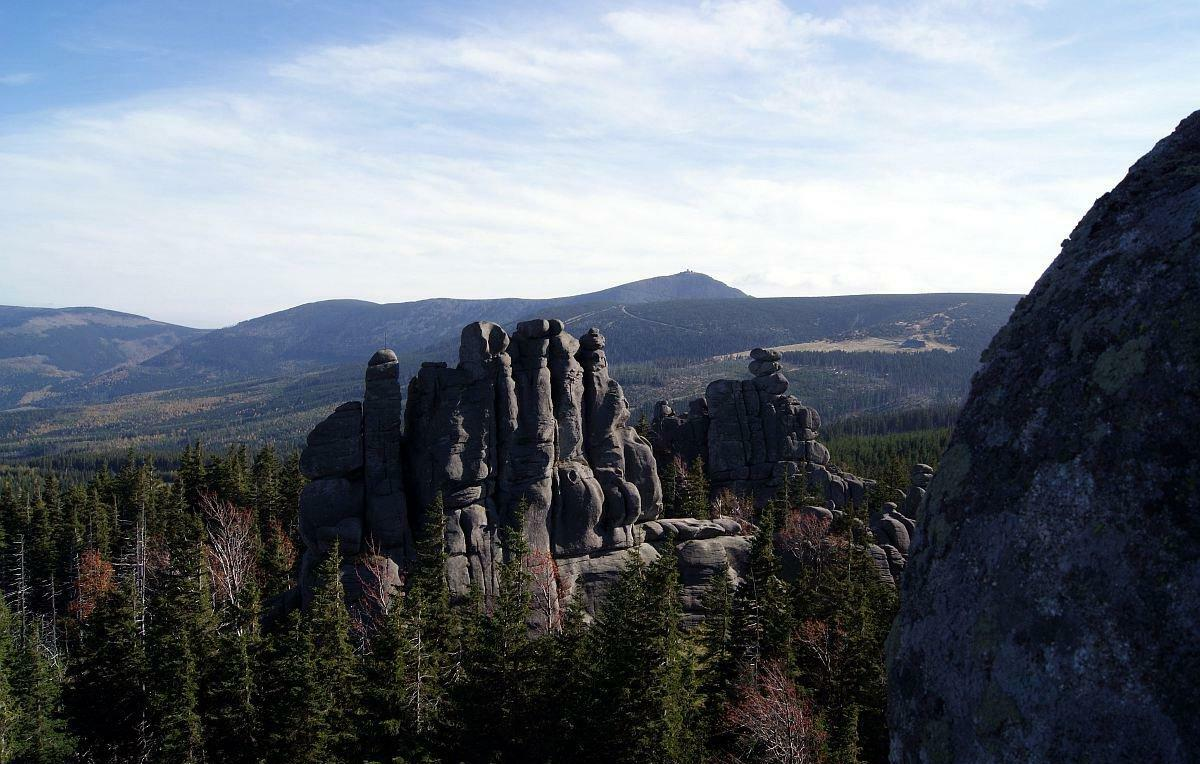
Tor landform made up of granite in the Sudetes

Weathering during the Cenozoic led to the formation of an etchplain in parts of Sudetes. While this etchplain has been eroded various landforms and weathering mantles have been suggested to attest its former existence. At present the mountain range shows a remarkable diversity of landforms. Some of the landforms present are escarpments, inselbergs, bornhardts, granitic domes, tors, flared slopes and weathering pits. Various escarpments have originated from faults and may reach heights of up to 500 m. To the northeast the Sudetes is separated from the Sudetic foreland by a sharp mountain front made up of an escarpment linked to the Sudetic Marginal Fault. Near Kaczawa this escarpment reaches 80 to 120 m in height. The relative influence of Pliocene-Quaternary tectonic movements and erosion in shaping the mountain landscape may vary along the northern front of the Sudetes.

During the Quaternary glaciations the Giant Mountains was the most glaciated part of the Sudetes. Evidence of this are its glacial cirques and the glacial valleys that develop next to it. The precise timing of the glaciations in the Sudetes is poorly constrained. Parts of the Sudetes remained free from glacier ice developing permafrost soils and periglacial landforms such as rock glaciers, nivation hollows, patterned ground, blockfields, solifluction landforms, blockstreams, tors and cryoplanation terraces. The occurrence or not of these periglacial landforms depends on altitude, the steepness and direction of slopes and the underlying rock type.

=== Mass wasting ===
Other than debris flows there is little contemporary mass wasting in the mountains. Avalanches are common in the Sudetes.

== History ==
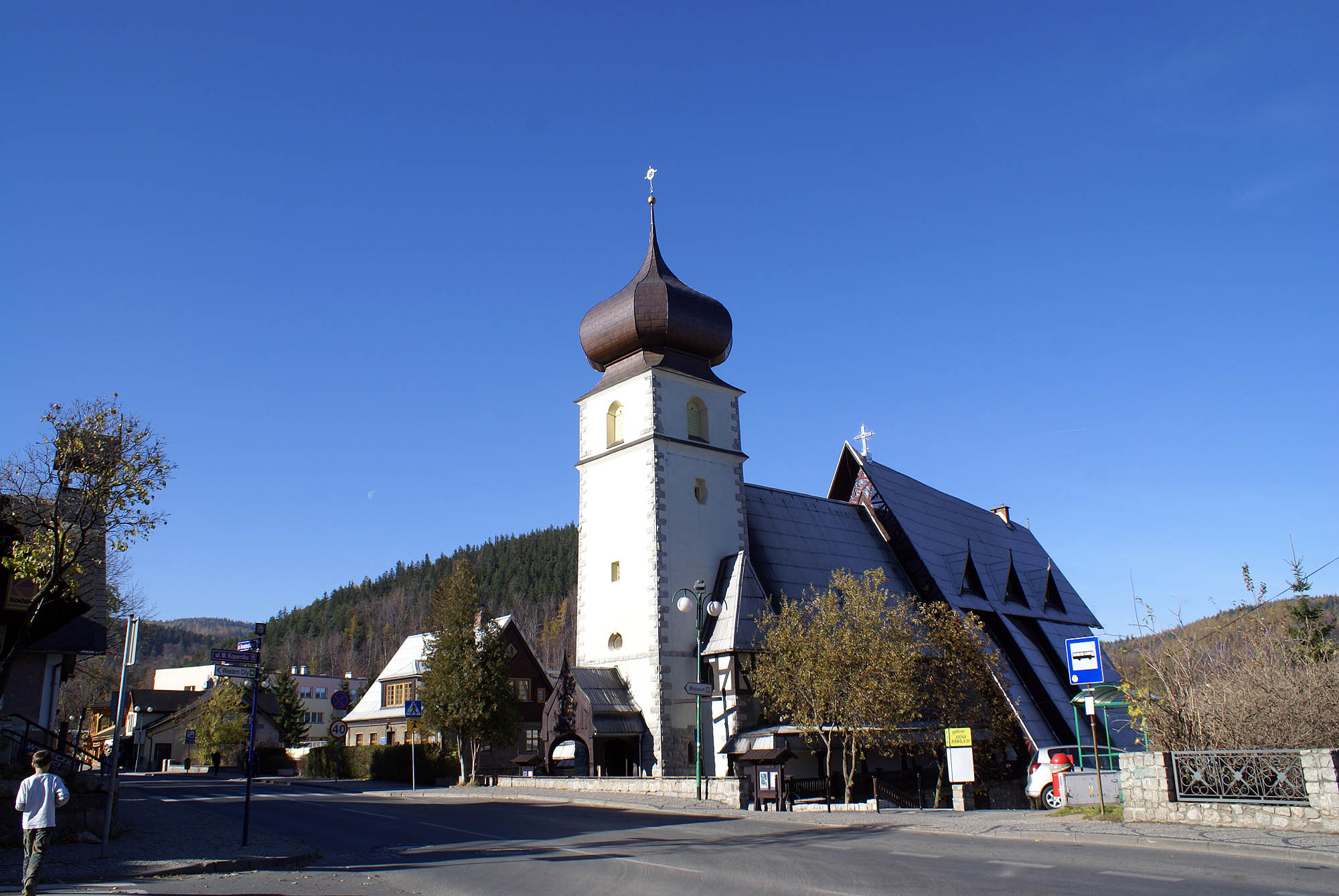
Karpacz

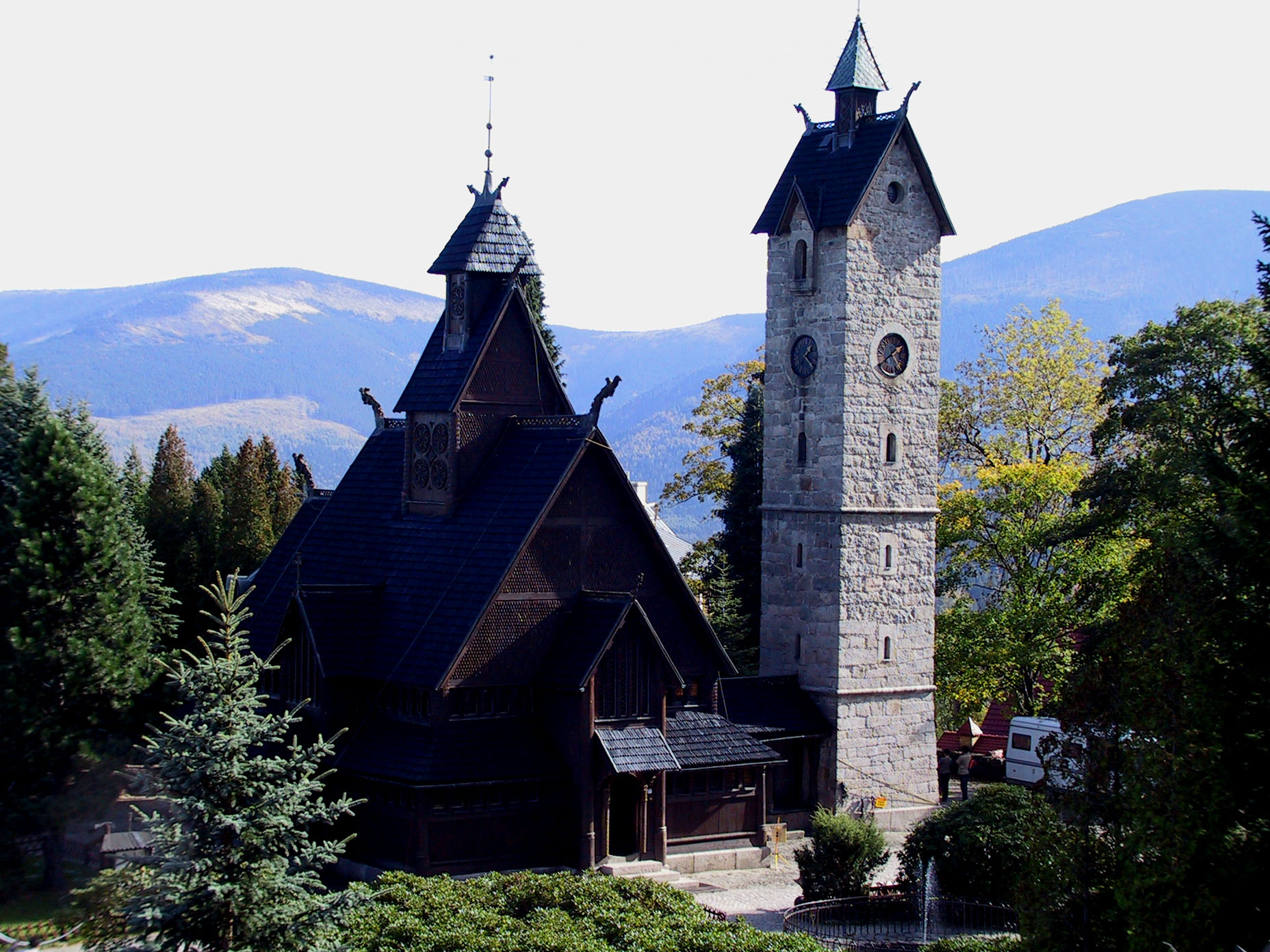
Vang Stave Church

The area around the Sudetes had by the 12th century been relatively densely settled with agriculture and settlements expanding further in the High Middle Ages from the 13th century onward. The majority of settlers were Germans from neighbouring Silesia, founding typical Waldhufendörfer. As this trend went on thinning of forest and deforestation had turned clearly unsustainable by the 14th century. In the 15th and 16th centuries agriculture had reached the inner part of Table Mountains in the Central Sudetes. Destruction and degradation of the Sudetes forest peaked in the 16th and 17th centuries with demand of firewood coming from glasshouses that operated through the area in the early modern period.

Some limited form of forest management begun in the 18th century while in the industrial age demand for firewood was sustained by metallurgic industries in the settlements and cities around the mountains. In the 19th century the Central Sudetes had an economic boom with sandstone quarrying and a flourishing tourism industry centered on the natural scenery. Despite this there was at least since the 1880s a trend of depopulation of villages and hamlets which continued into the 20th century. Since World War II various areas that were cleared of forest have been re-naturalized. Industrial activity across Europe has caused considerable damage to the forests as acid rain and heavy metals has arrived with westerly and southwesterly winds. Silver firs have proven particularly vulnerable to industrial soil contamination.

=== Sudetes and "Sudetenland" ===
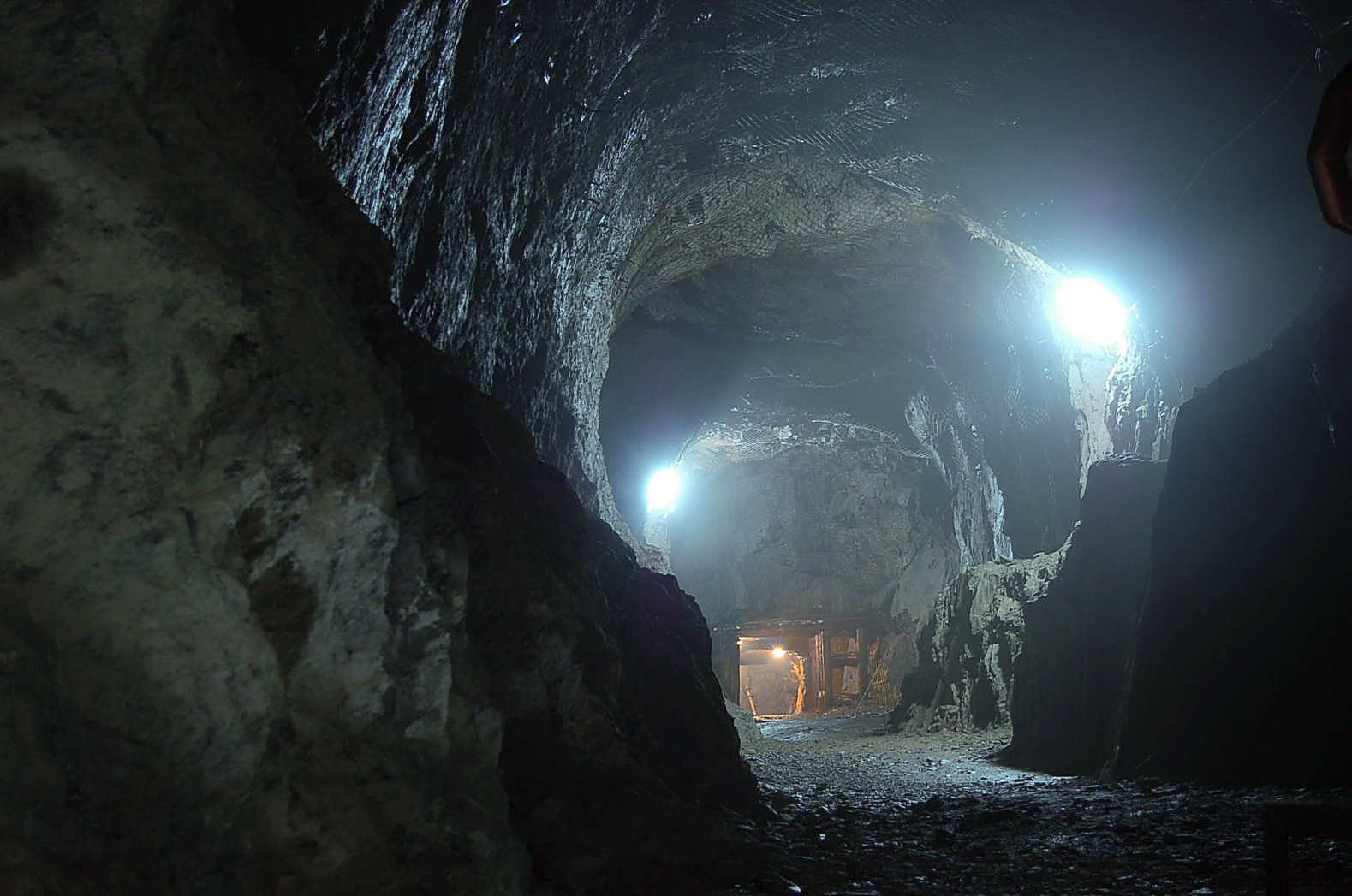
Project Riese, Owl Mountains

After World War I, the name Sudetenland came into use to describe areas of the First Czechoslovak Republic with large ethnic German populations. In 1918, the short-lived rump state of German-Austria proclaimed a Province of the Sudetenland in northern Moravia and Austrian Silesia around the city of Opava (Troppau).

The term was used in a wider sense when on 1 October 1933 Konrad Henlein founded the Sudeten German Party and in Nazi German parlance Sudetendeutsche (Sudeten Germans) referred to all autochthonous ethnic Germans in Czechoslovakia. They were heavily clustered in the entire mountainous periphery of Czechoslovakia—not only in the former Moravian Provinz Sudetenland but also along the northwestern Bohemian borderlands with German Lower Silesia, Saxony and Bavaria, in an area formerly called German Bohemia. In total, the German minority population of interwar Czechoslovakia numbered around 20% of the total national population.

Sparking the Sudeten Crisis, Adolf Hitler got his future enemies Britain and France to concede the Sudetenland with most of the Czechoslovak border fortifications in the 1938 Munich Agreement, leaving the remainder of Czechoslovakia shorn of its natural borders and buffer zone, finally occupied by Germany in March 1939. After being annexed by Nazi Germany, much of the region was redesignated as the Reichsgau Sudetenland.

After World War II, most of the previous population of the Sudetes was forcibly expelled on the basis of the Potsdam Agreement and the Beneš decrees, and the region was resettled by new Polish and Czechoslovak citizens. A considerable proportion of the Czechoslovak populace thereafter strongly objected to the use of the term Sudety. In the Czech Republic the designation Krkonošsko-jesenická subprovincie is used in academic context and usually only the discrete Czech names for the individual mountain ranges (e.g. Giant Mountains) appear, as under Subdivisions above.

== Economy and tourism ==
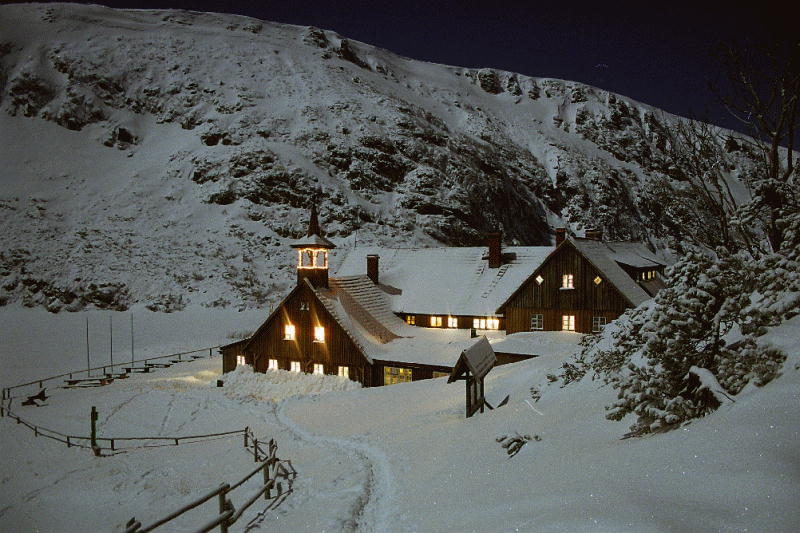
Winter in the Giant Mountains. Polish refuge – Samotnia (1195 m a.s.l.)

Part of the economy of the Sudetes is dedicated to tourism. Coal mining towns like Wałbrzych have re-oriented their economies towards tourism since the decline of mining in the 1980s. As of 2000 scholar Krzysztof R. Mazurski judged that the Sudetes, much like Poland's Baltic coast and the Carpathians, were unlikely to attract much foreign tourism. Sandstone was quarried in Sudetes during the 19th and 20th centuries. Likewise volcanic rock has also been quarried to such degree untouched volcanoes are scarce. Sandstone labyrinths have been a notable tourist attraction since the 19th century with considerable investments being done in projecting trails some of which involve rock engineering.

In the Sudetes there are several spa towns with sanatoria: Jeseník, Velké Losiny, Bludov, Lipová-lázně, Janské Lázně and Karlova Studánka in the Czech Republic, and Kudowa-Zdrój, Polanica-Zdrój, Duszniki-Zdrój, Lądek-Zdrój and Jedlina-Zdrój in Poland. In many places the tourist base is developed – hotels, guest houses and ski infrastructure.

The nearest international airports are Dresden Airport in Dresden and Wrocław Airport in Wrocław.

=== Notable towns ===
Towns in this area with more than 10,000 inhabitants include:

Poland

- Bielawa
- Bogatynia
- Boguszów-Gorce
- Dzierżoniów
- Głuchołazy
- Jawor
- Jelenia Góra
- Kamienna Góra
- Kłodzko
- Kowary
- Lubań
- Nowa Ruda
- Strzegom
- Świdnica
- Świebodzice
- Wałbrzych
- Ząbkowice Śląskie
- Zgorzelec

Czech Republic

- Bruntál
- Jablonec nad Nisou
- Jeseník
- Krnov
- Liberec
- Náchod
- Šumperk
- Trutnov
- Vrchlabí
- Zábřeh

Germany

- Bautzen
- Bischofswerda
- Dresden
- Ebersbach-Neugersdorf
- Görlitz
- Kamenz
- Löbau
- Neustadt in Sachsen
- Radeberg
- Zittau

== Gallery ==
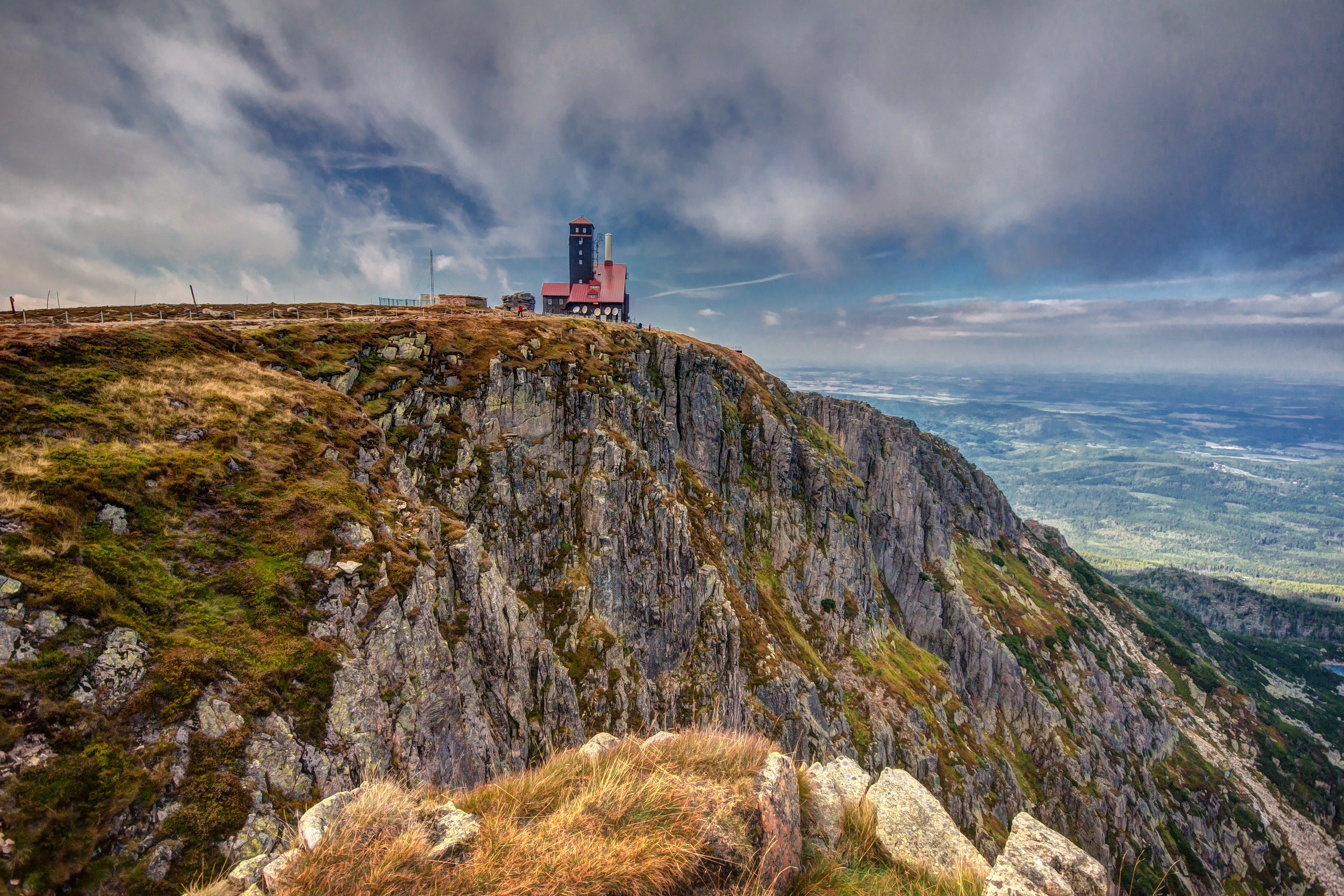
Śnieżne Kotły

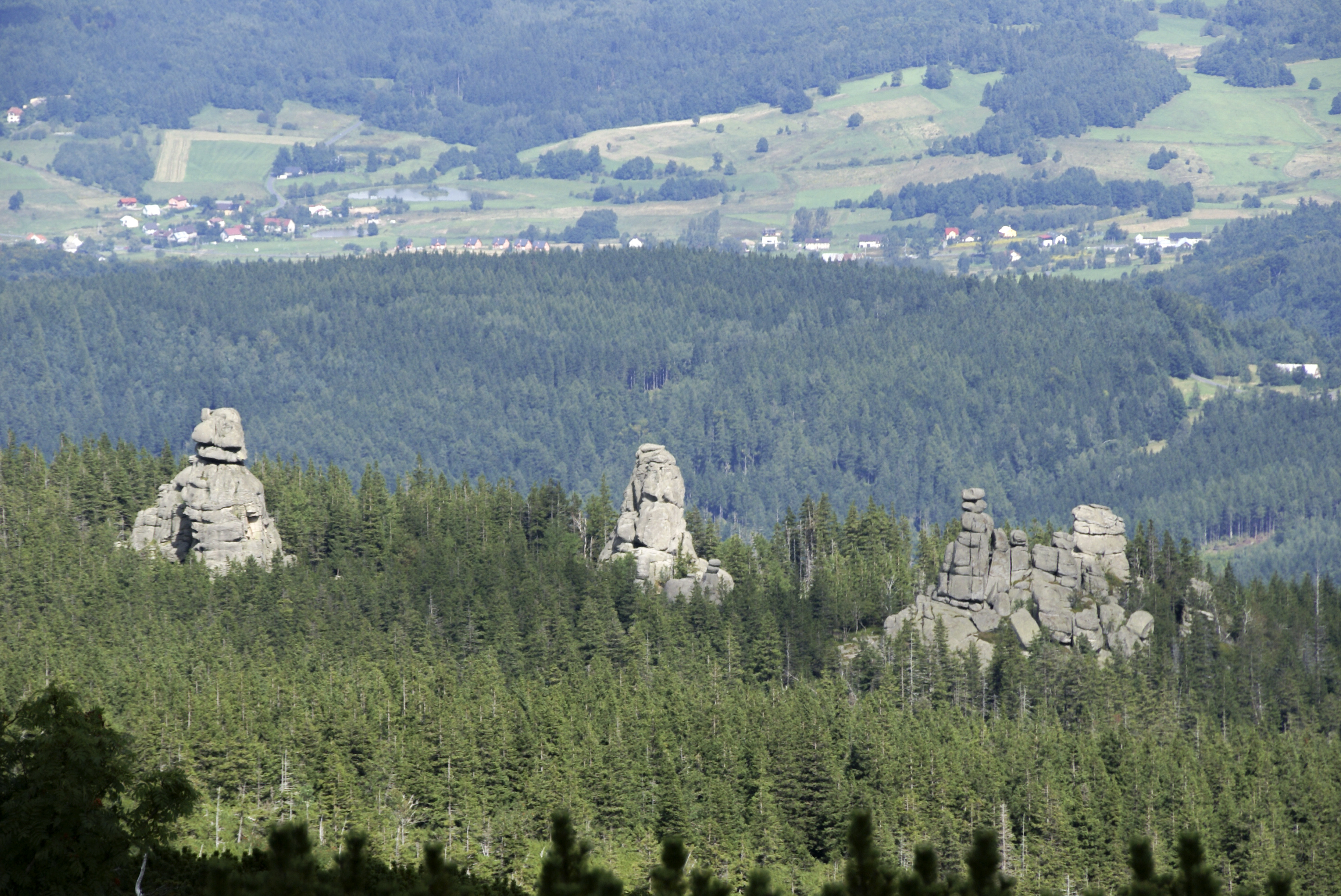
Pielgrzymy

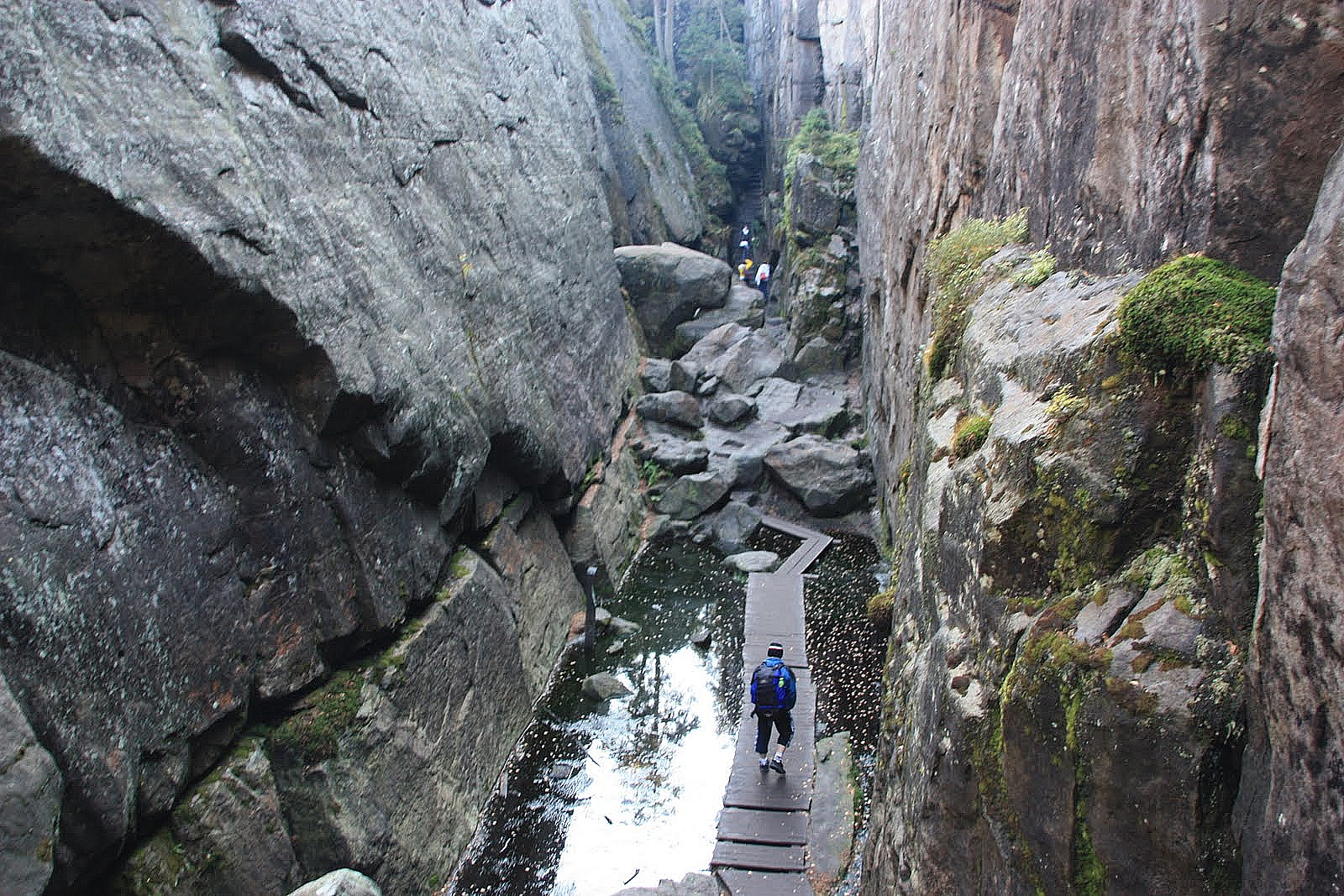
"Hell" on Szczeliniec Wielki, Table Mountains

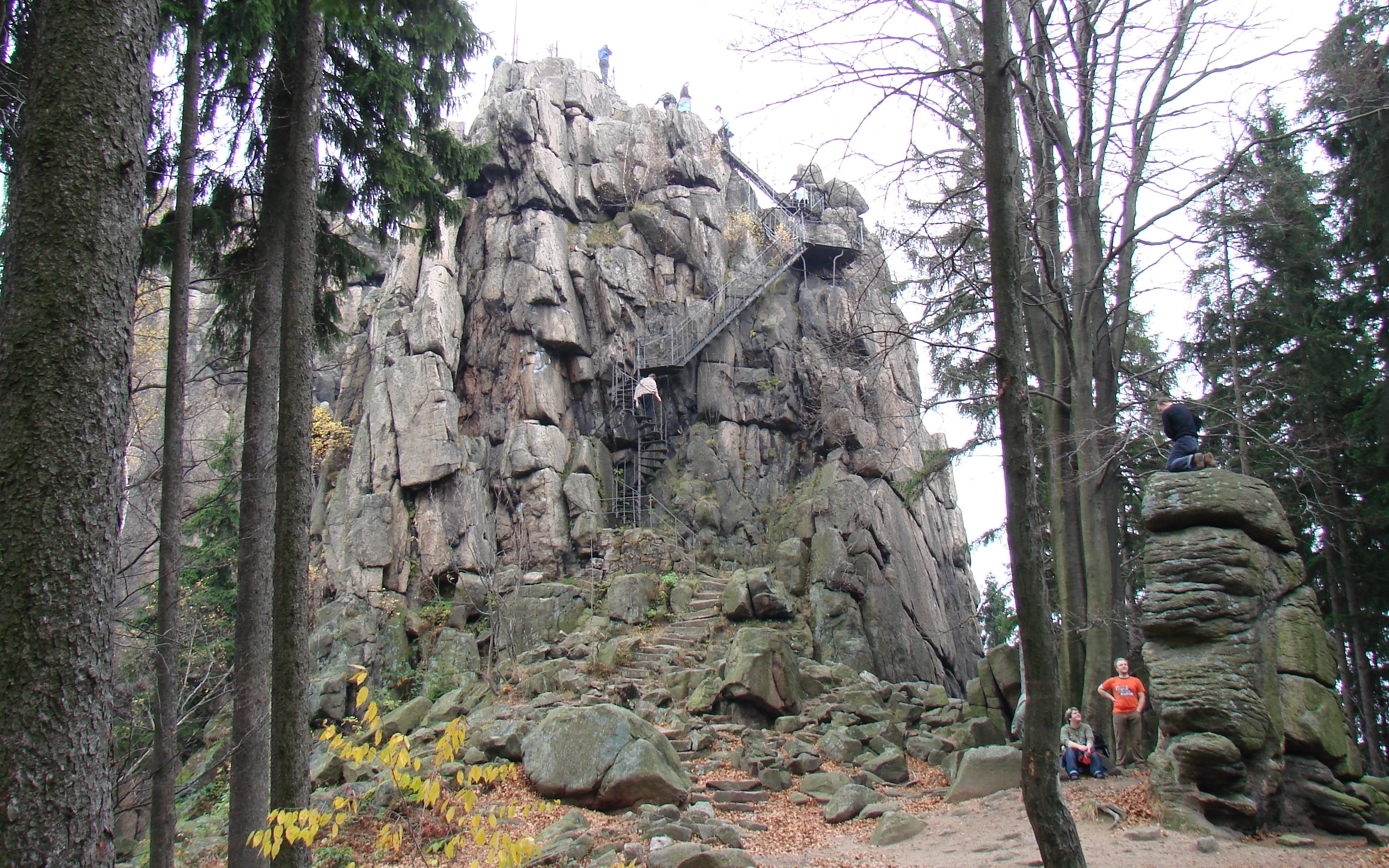
Sokolik Wielki in the Góry Sokole

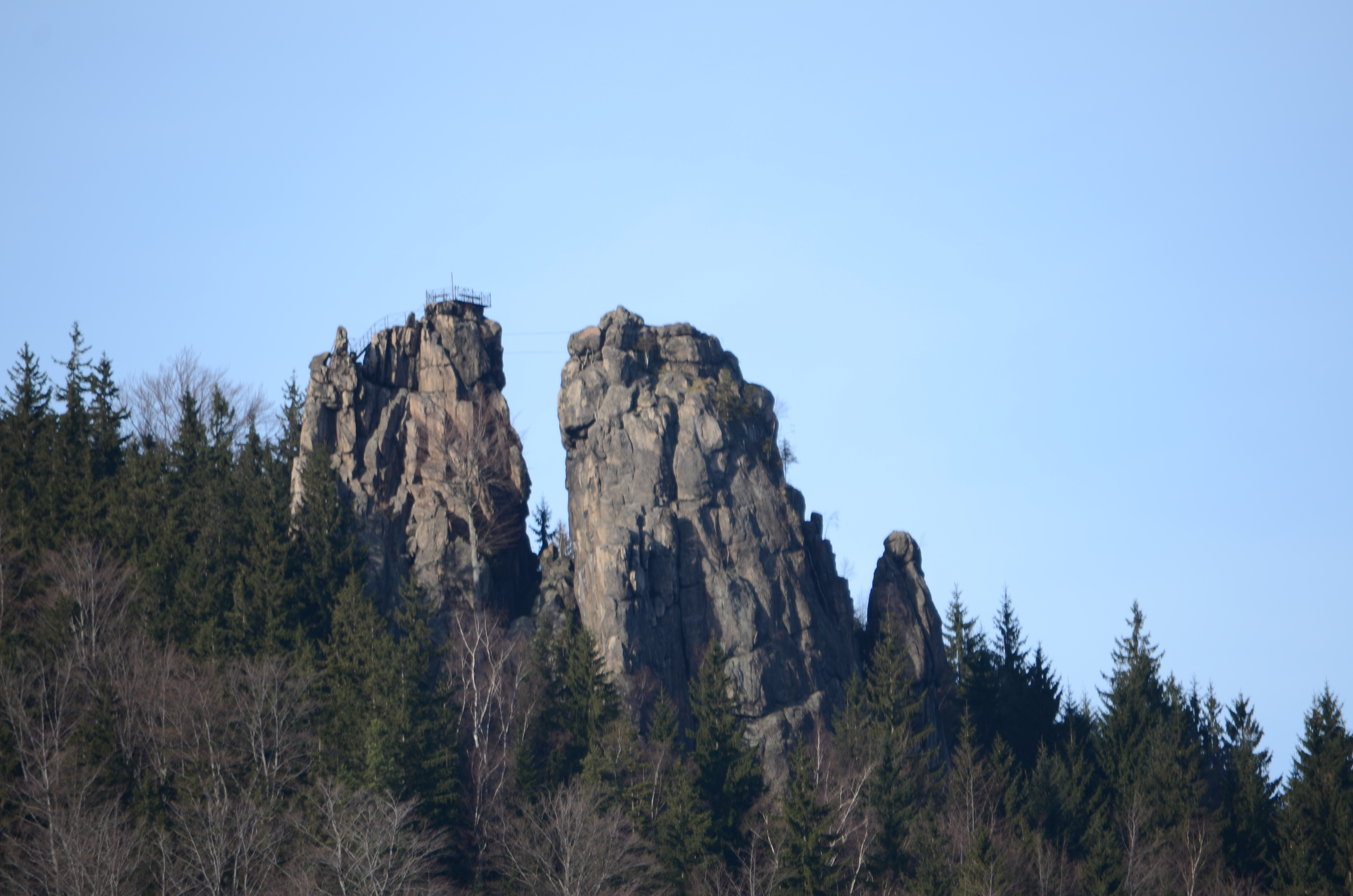
Sokolik Wielki and Sokolik Mały in the Góry Sokole

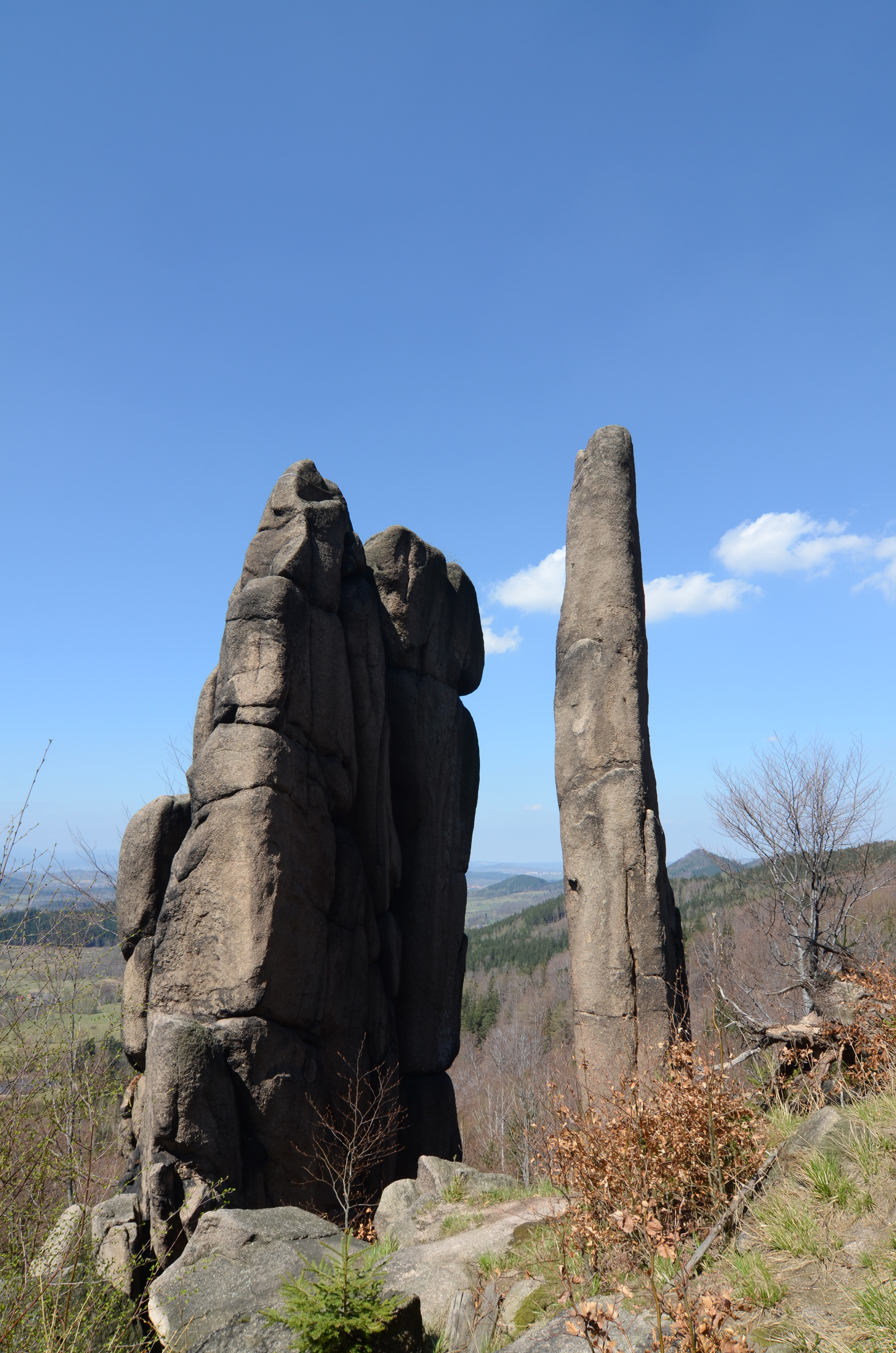
Enis in the Rudawy Janowickie

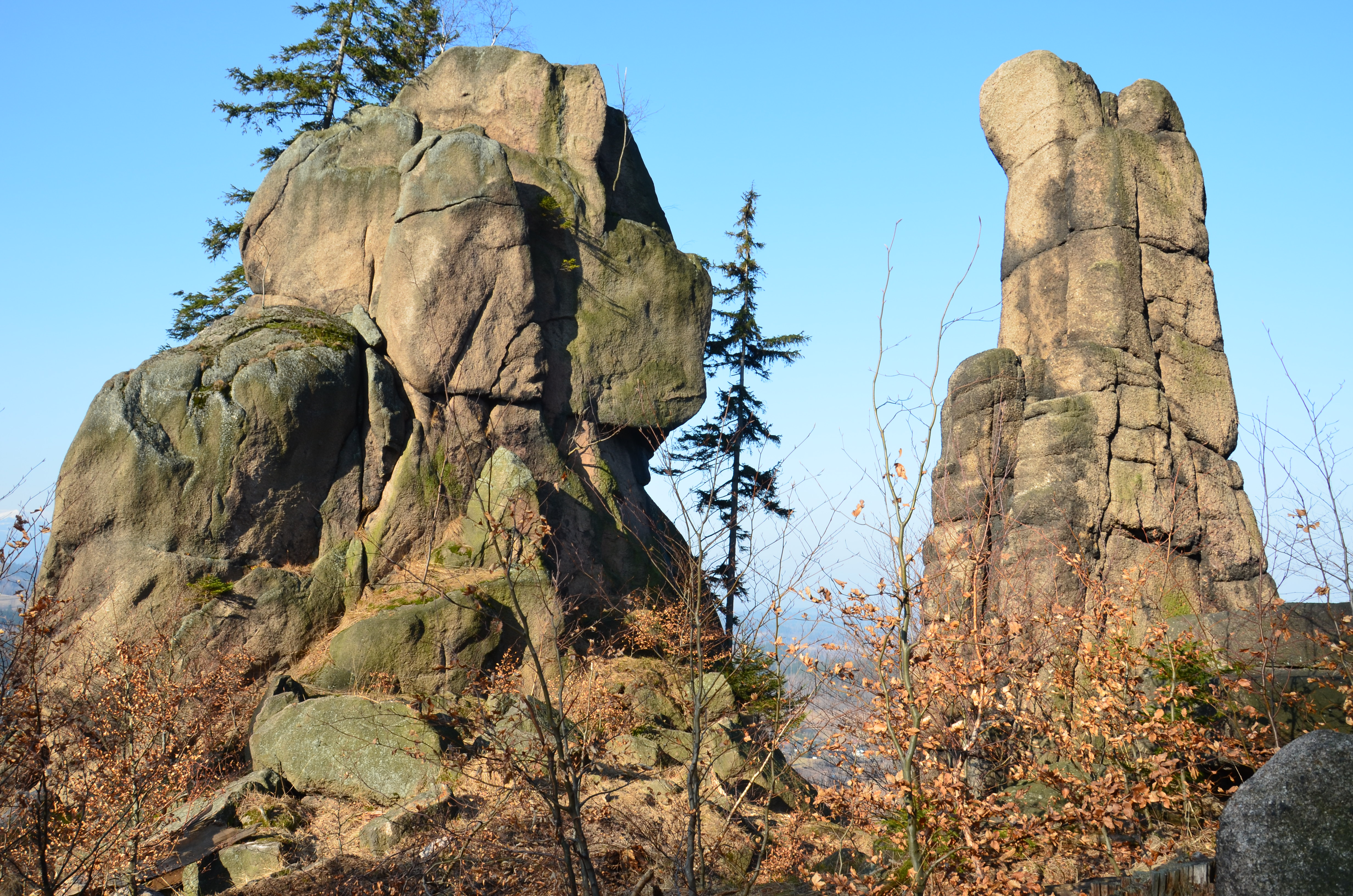
Starościńskie Skały in the Rudawy Janowickie

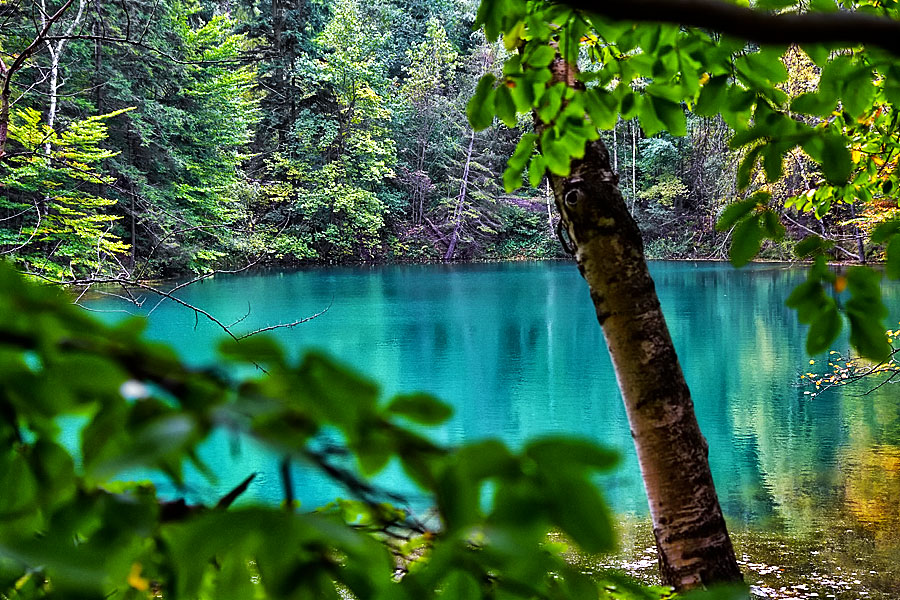
Colourful lakelets

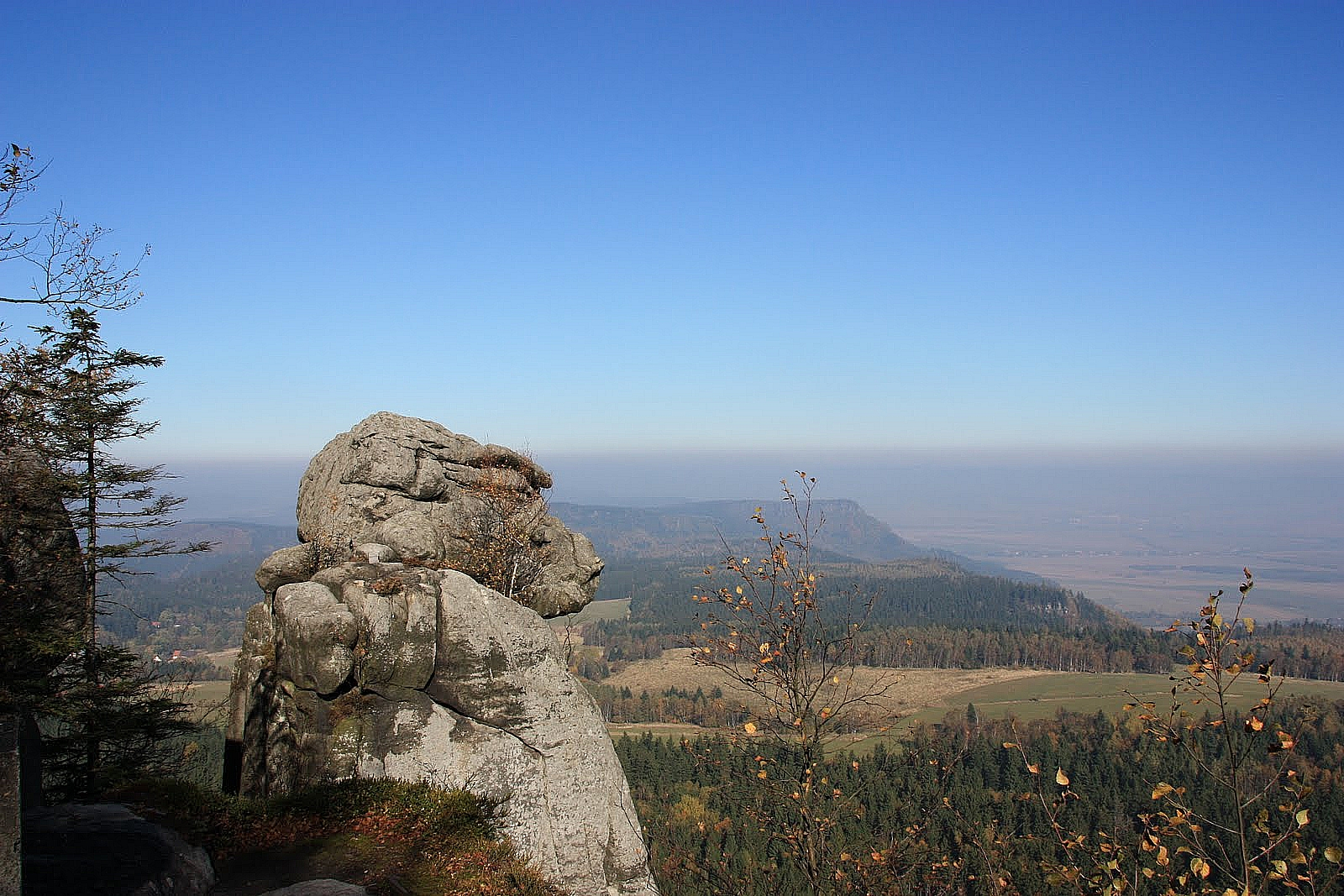
Table Mountains

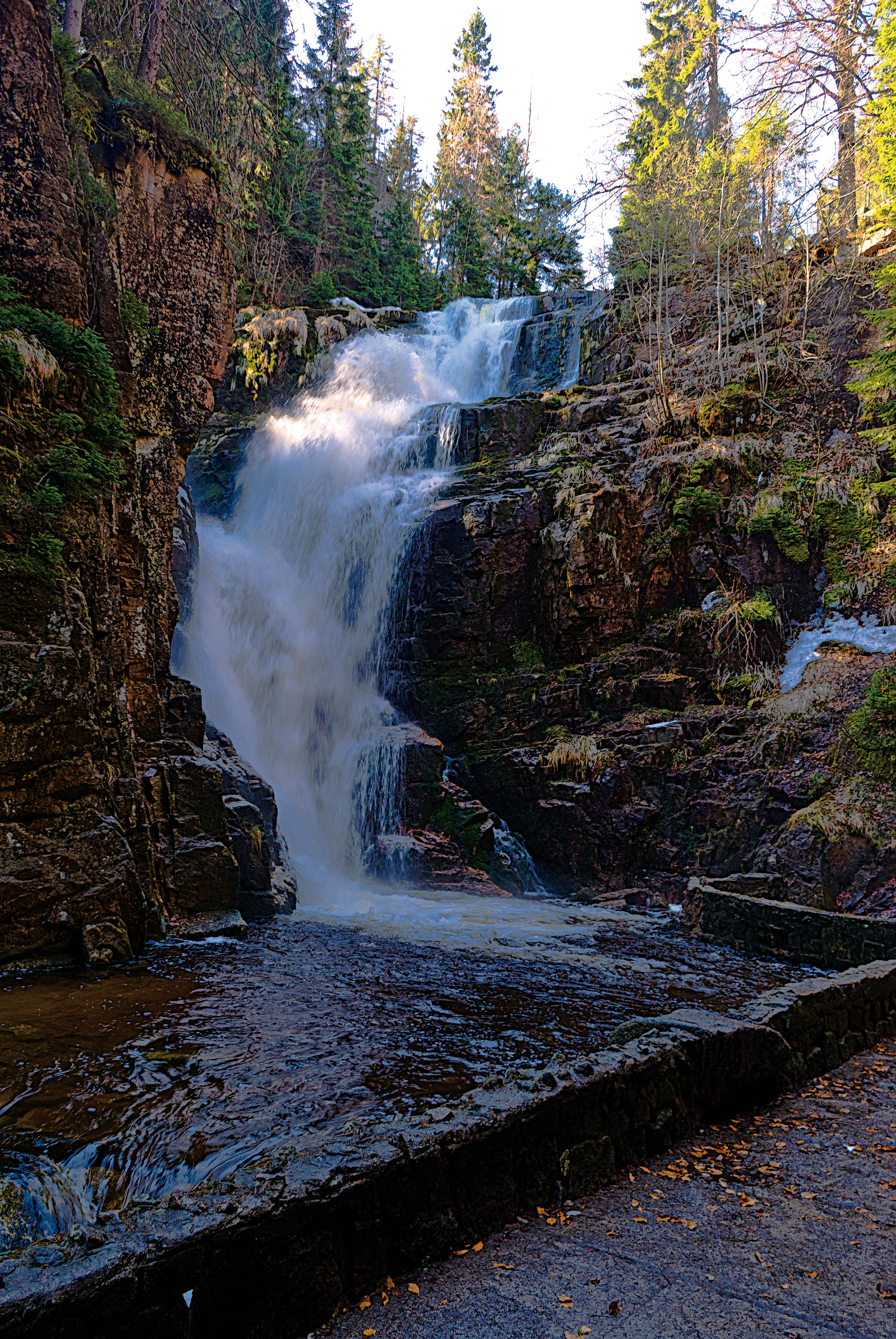
Kamieńczyk Falls

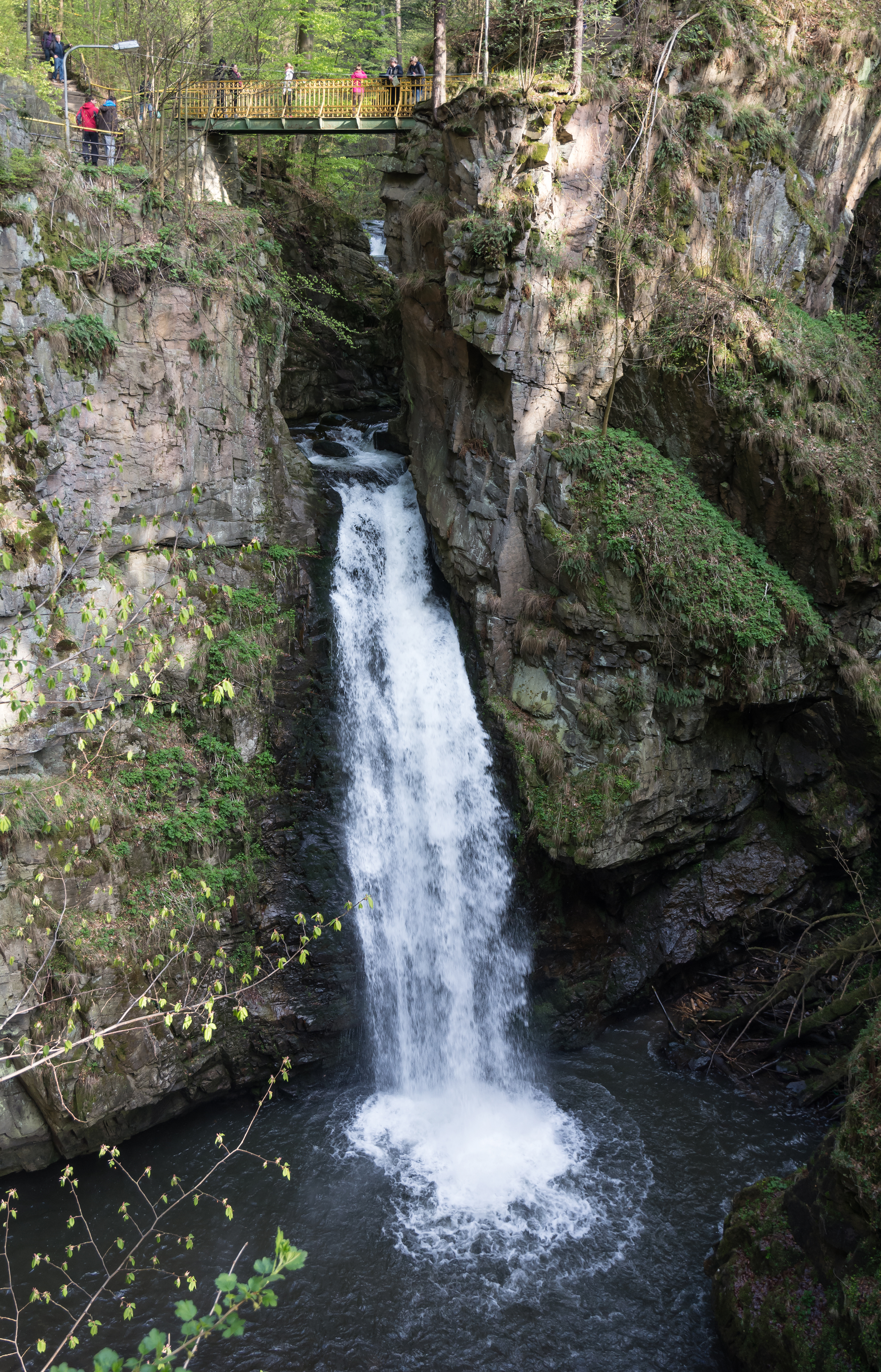
Wilczki Falls

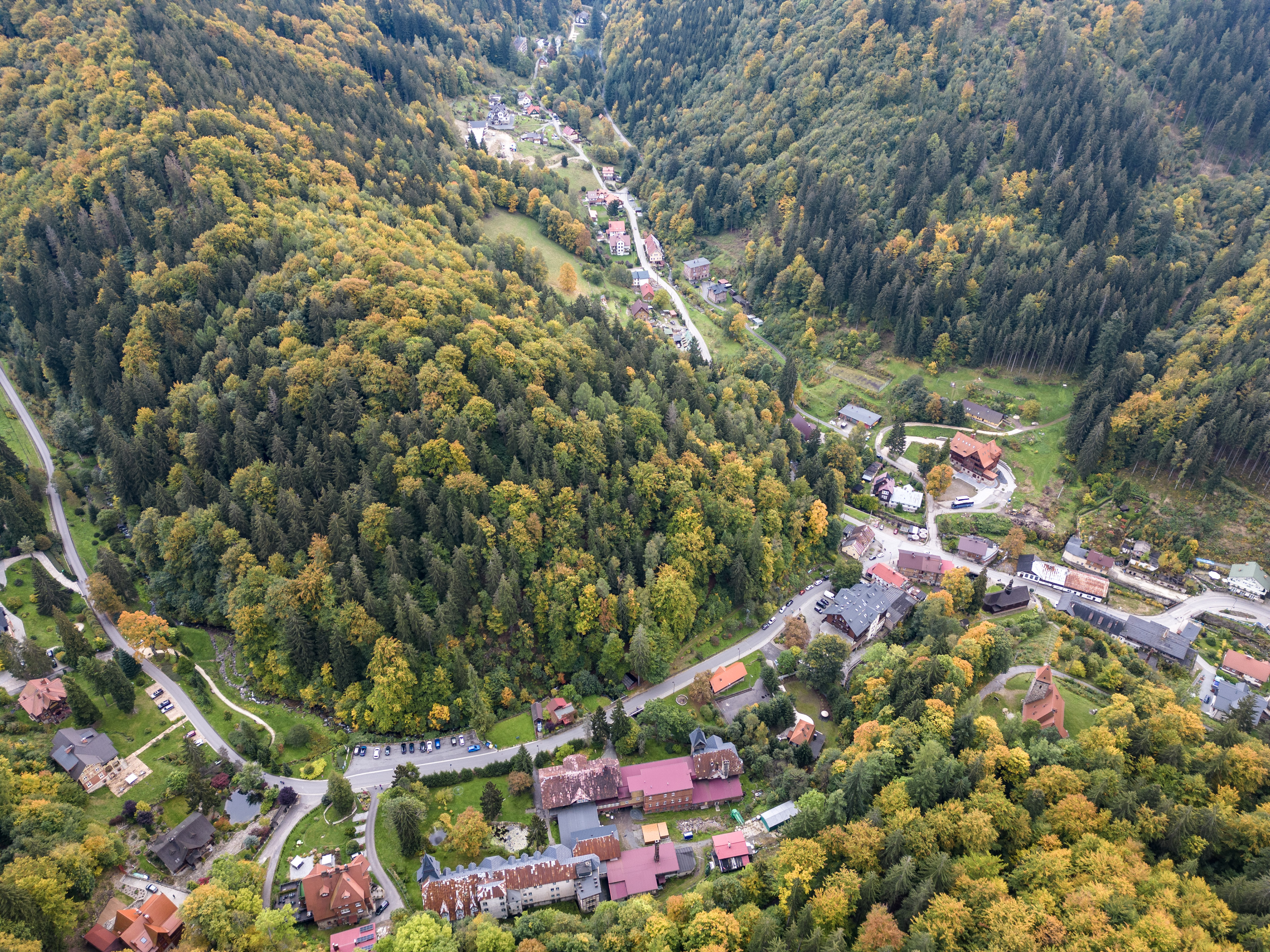
Międzygórze, Lower Silesian Voivodeship

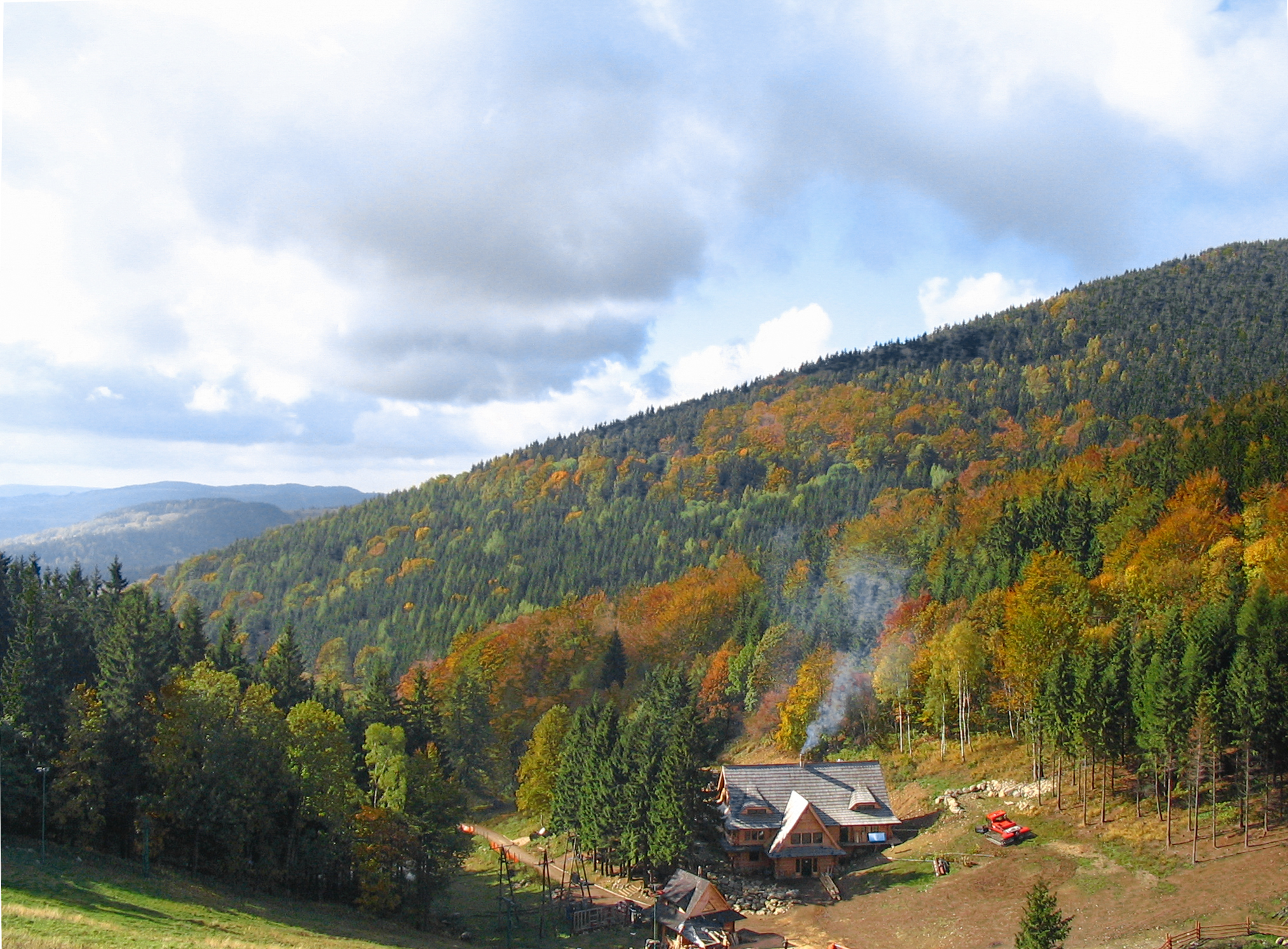
A view from Zygmuntówka refuge, Owl Mountain range (Góry Sowie)

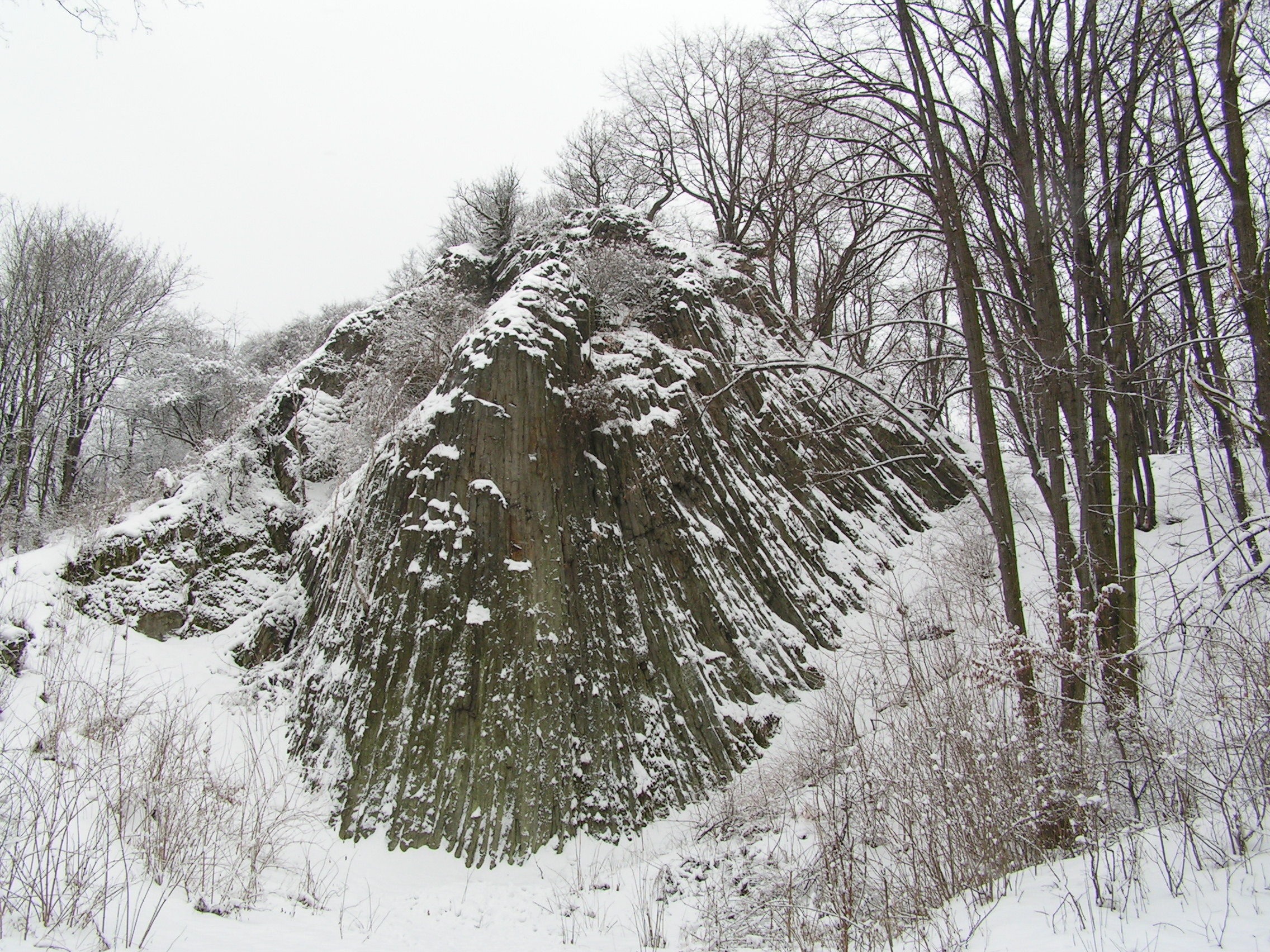
Małe Organy Myśliborskie

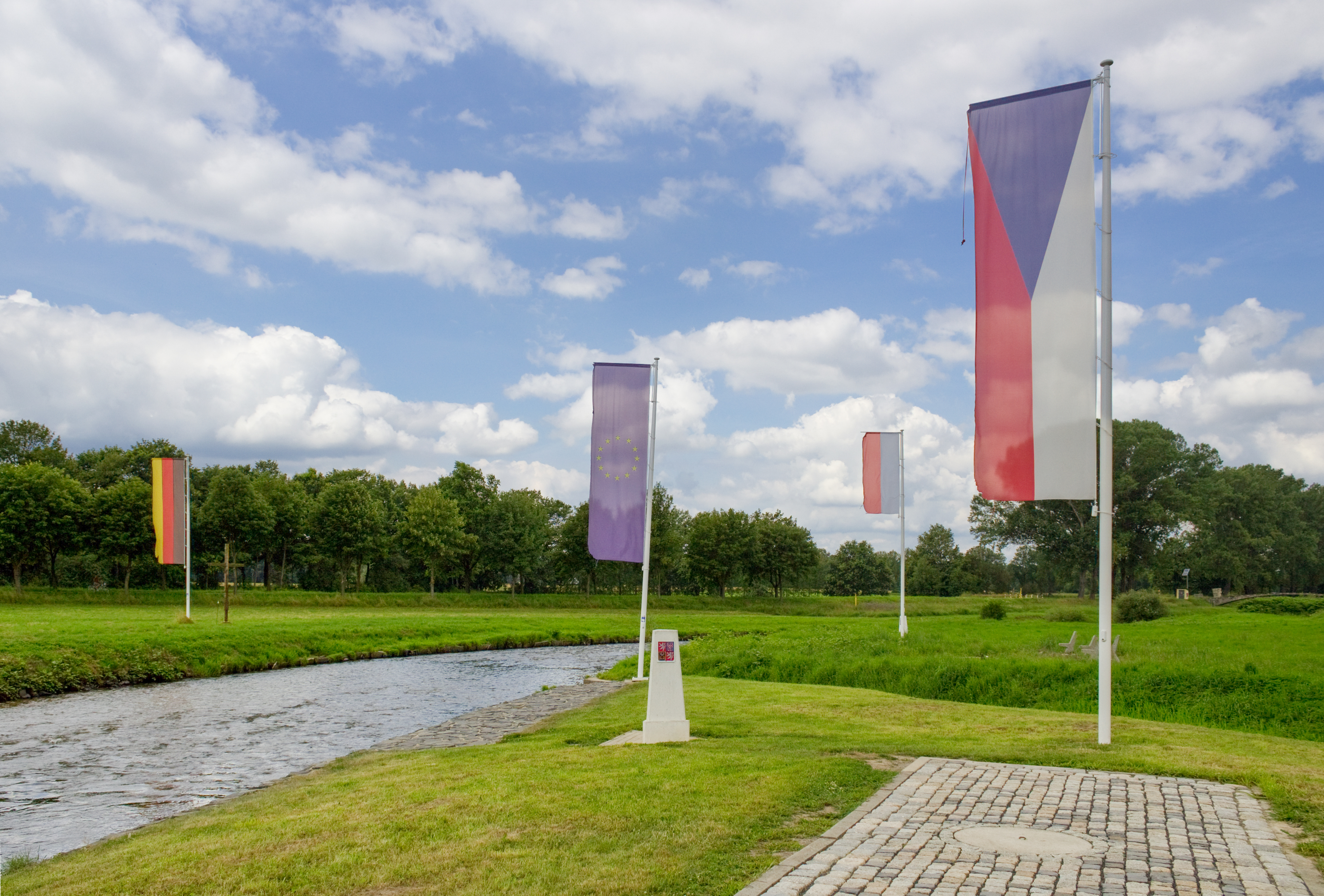
Tripoint of Germany, Czech Republic, and Poland in the Eastern Upper Lusatia

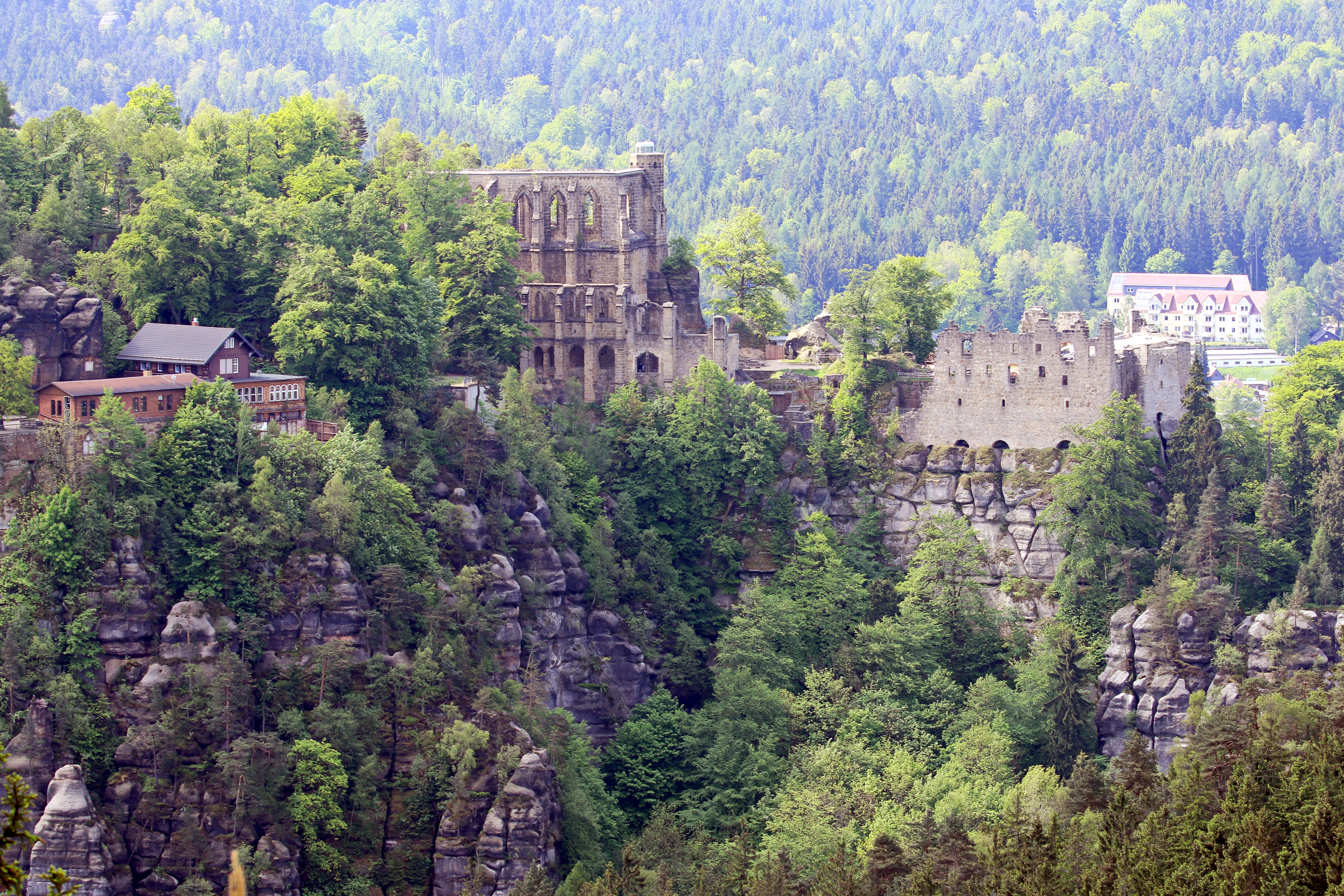
Monastery ruins on the Oybin

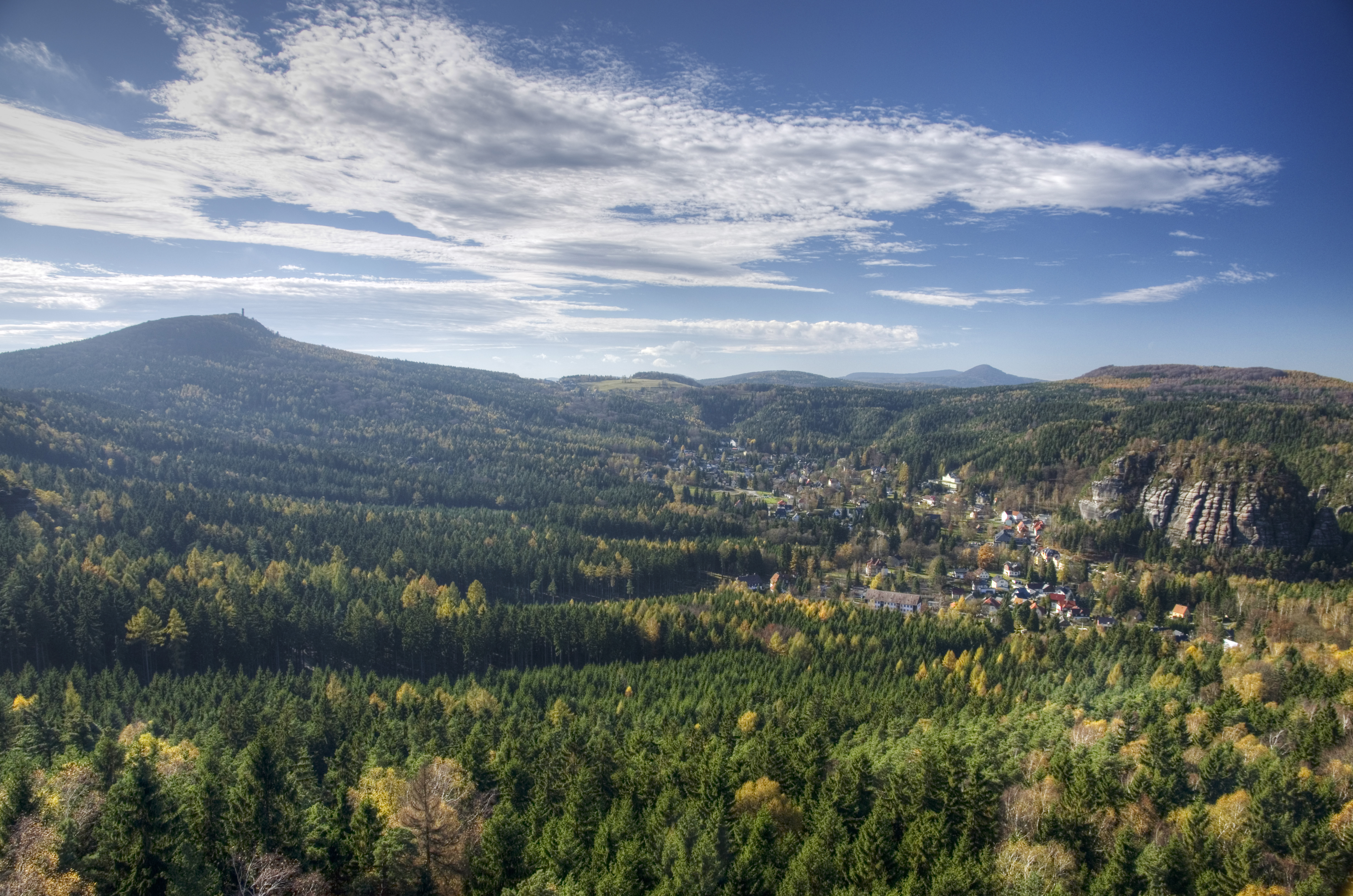
Zittau Mountains with the Hochwald mountain

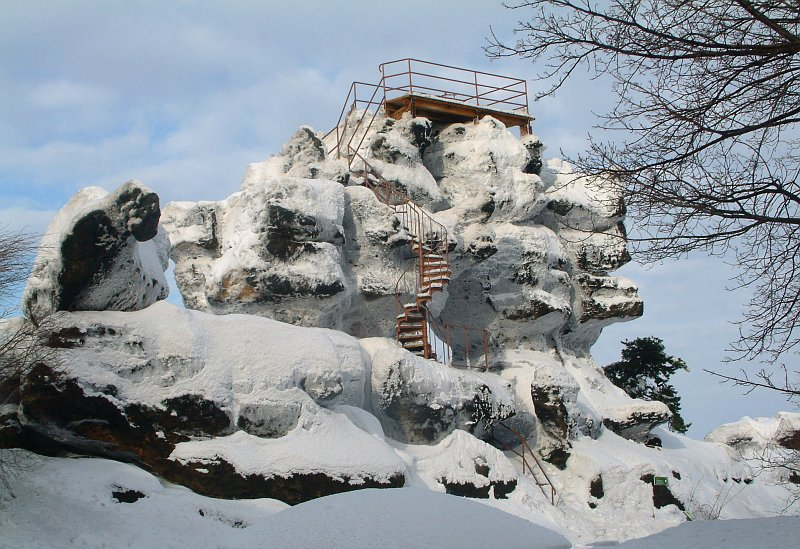
Rock Gate (Felsentor)

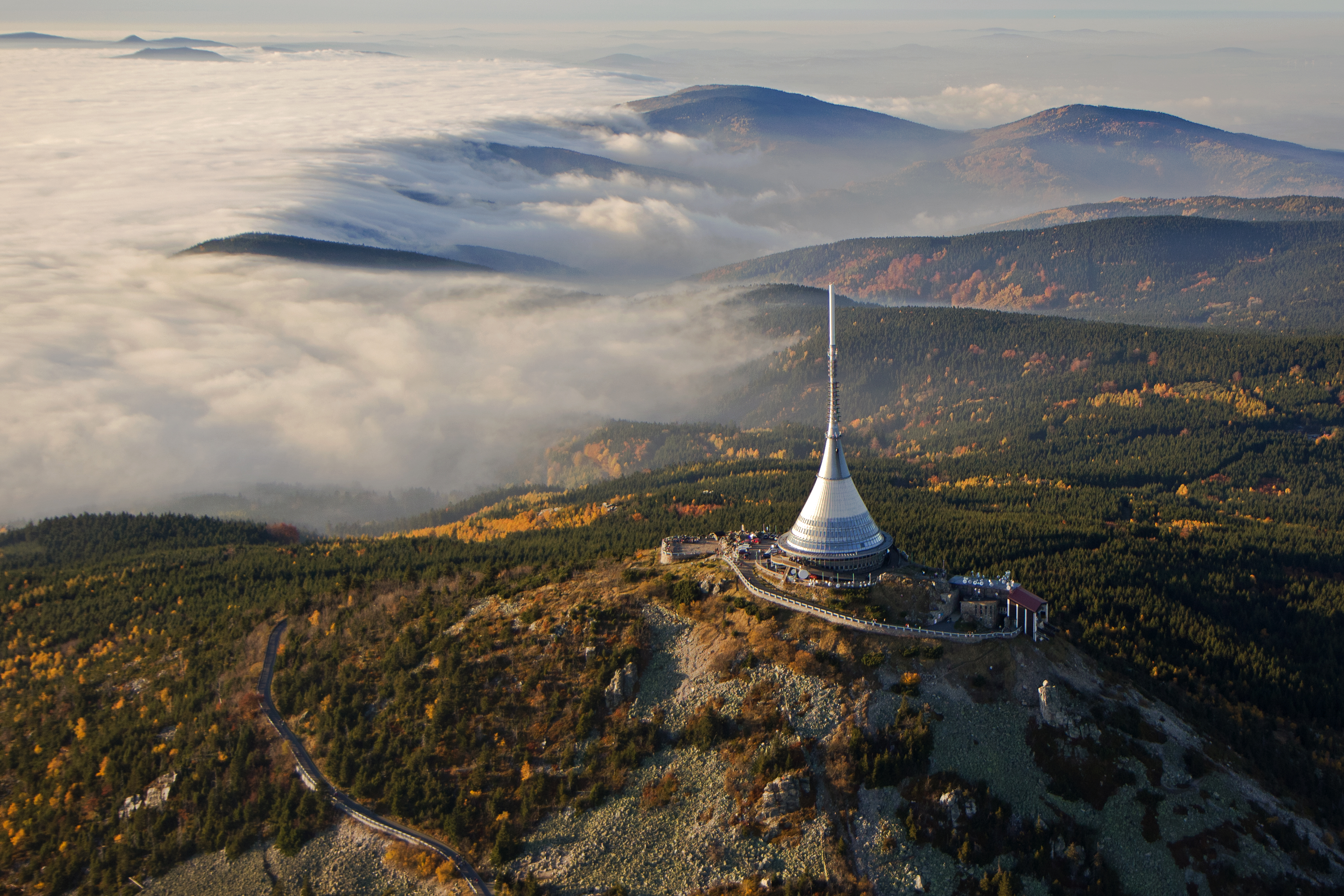
Ještěd–Kozákov Ridge

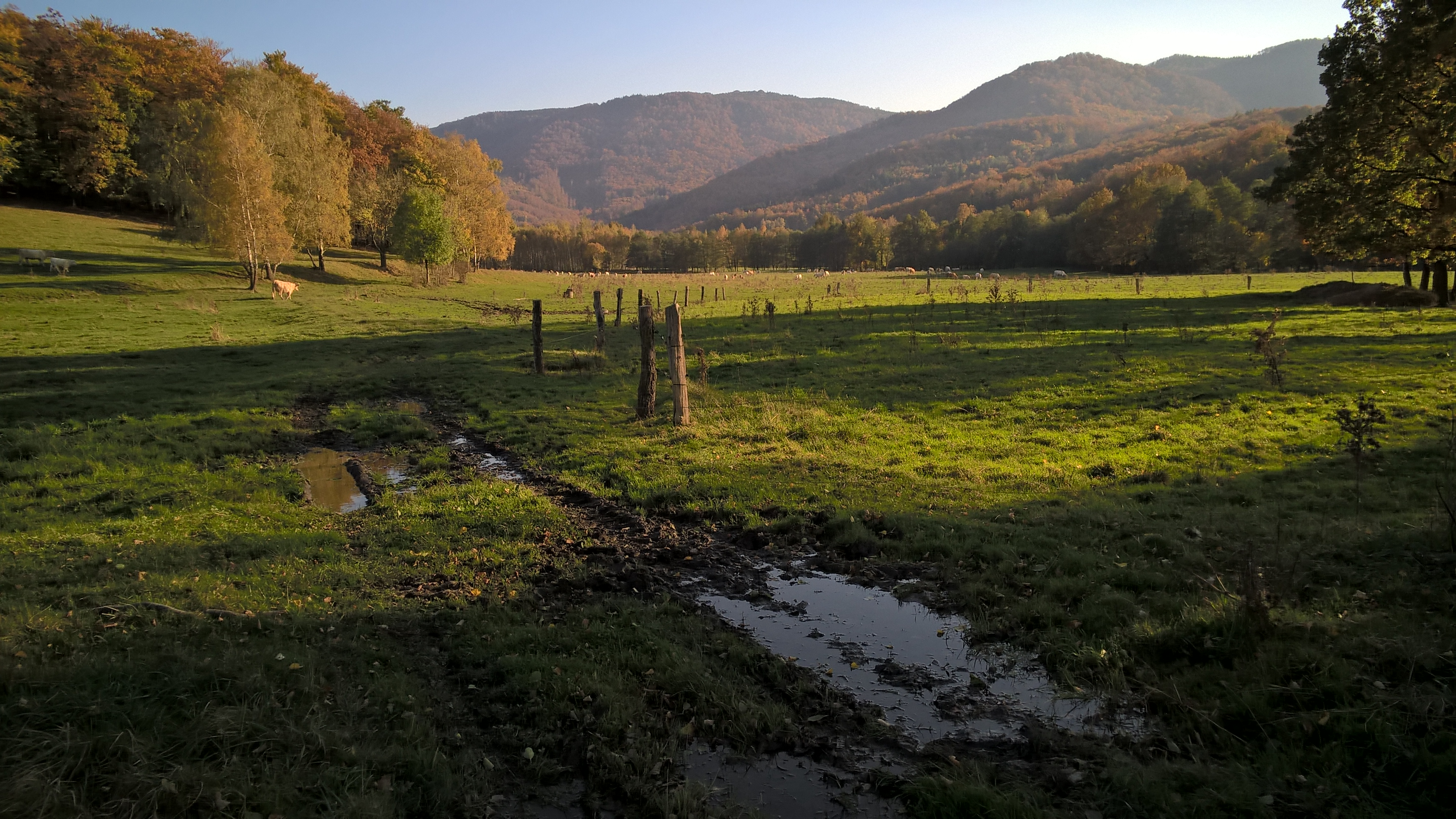
View towards the Jizerskohorské bučiny National Nature Reserve

== See also ==
- Chojnik
- Crown of Polish Mountains
- Main Sudetes Trail
- Grüssau Abbey
- Izera railway
- Kłodzko Fortress
- Książ
- Niesytno Castle
- Tourism in Poland
- Wambierzyce
- Wilczka Falls Nature Reserve
