= Ostrzyca (hill) =

Mountain in Poland

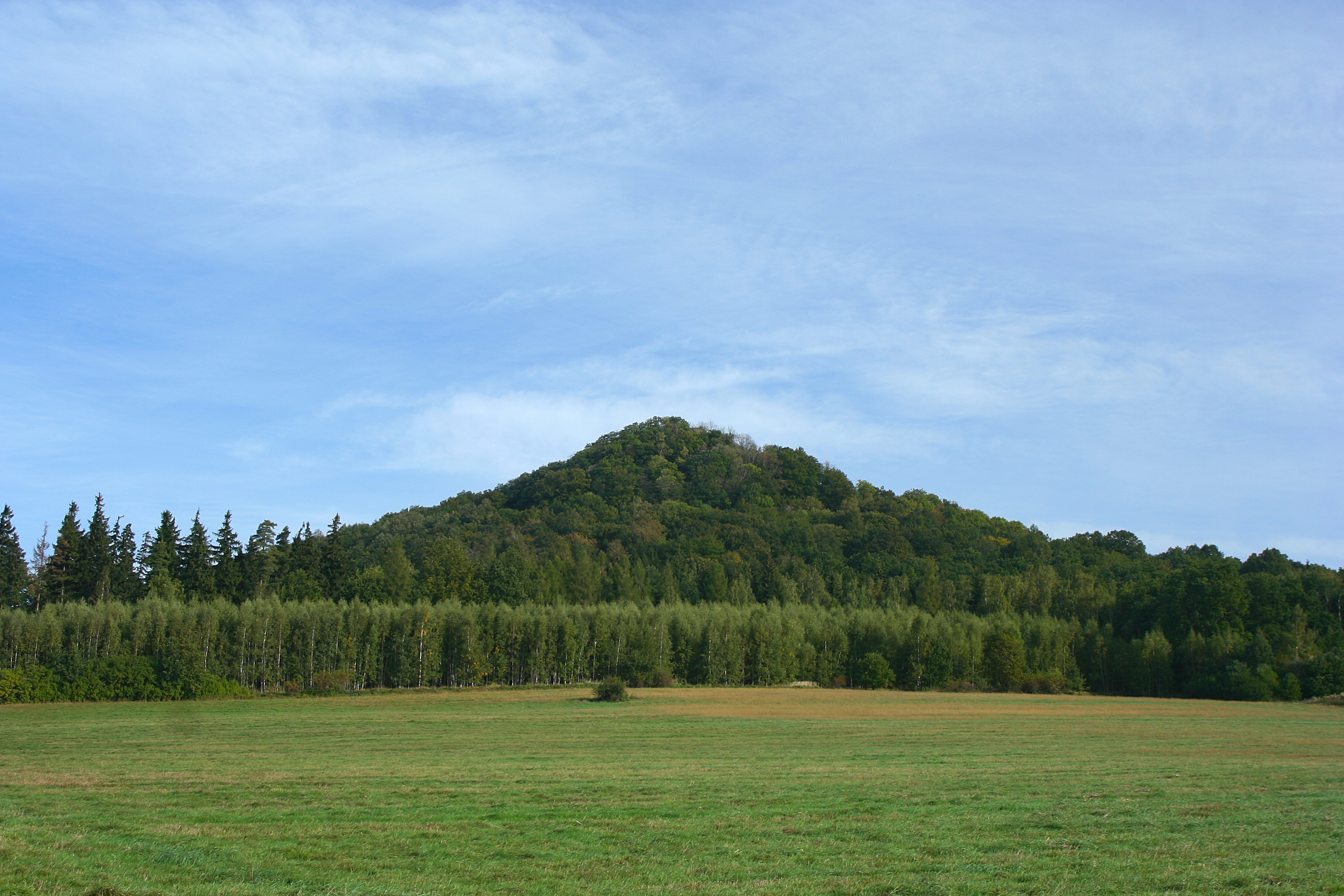

Highest point
- Elevation: 501 m (1,644 ft)
- Prominence: 151 m (495 ft)
- Coordinates: 51°3′22″N 15°45′48″E

Geography
- Location within Poland
- Location: Poland
- Parent range: Kaczawskie Foothills

Geology
- Rock age: Neogene
- Mountain type: Volcanic neck

Ostrzyca is a forested conical hill in southwestern Poland. Rising 501 metres above the Kaczawskie Foothills, it is a volcanic plug formed during the Neogene period, featuring distinctive hexagonal columnar jointing in its basanite rock. The hill is protected within the Ostrzyca Proboszczowicka nature reserve, established in 1962 to preserve its unique flora and geological features. Ostrzyca serves as a key geopoint in the Land of Extinct Volcanoes Geopark, providing educational opportunities about volcanic processes and geomorphology.

== Location and conservation ==
Ostrzyca rises above the Kaczawskie Foothills in Lower Silesia, within the Ostrzyca Proboszczowicka nature reserve, established in 1962 to protect its valuable floristic communities and geological features. Its flanks are strewn with angular debris formed by periglacial weathering during the last Ice Age.

== Geology ==
The summit exposes a well-developed hexagonal columnar jointing, formed as the Cenozoic basanite neck cooled and contracted. This neck intruded Miocene-age via a conduit piercing Lower Permian sandstones and conglomerates.

=== Petrology and mineralogy ===
In thin section, Ostrzyca's rock reveals large clinopyroxene crystals—so-called "megacrysts"—up to 3 cm long set in a fine-grained matrix of olivine, clinopyroxene, plagioclase and nepheline. These megacrysts are aluminian-sodian diopside (magneiusm number 0.61–0.70) and frequently host well-formed apatite crystals up to 7 mm across. Geochemical analysis shows they are strongly enriched in light rare-earth elements—up to 18 times primitive-mantle levels—and show clear positive anomalies in zirconium, hafnium and tantalum. A narrow reaction rim around each megacryst matches the composition of the surrounding clinopyroxene in the matrix, indicating it crystallised directly from the same basanitic melt. Together, these features imply the megacrysts grew as cumulate fragments in the mid-crust and were then carried to the surface by a later pulse of primitive basanitic magma.

== Geotourism ==
Since 2017, Ostrzyca has been promoted as a key geopoint within the Land of Extinct Volcanoes Geopark. The Sudetic Educational Centre organises field trips—co-financed by the Lower Silesian Fund for Environmental Protection—to the summit, using the hill as an open-air classroom for volcanic processes, geomorphology and the effects of climate change. Excursion content is adjusted to participants’ ages and backgrounds to maximise educational value.
