= Crown of Polish Mountains =

28 mountain peaks

Coordinates: 49°10′46″N 20°5′17″E

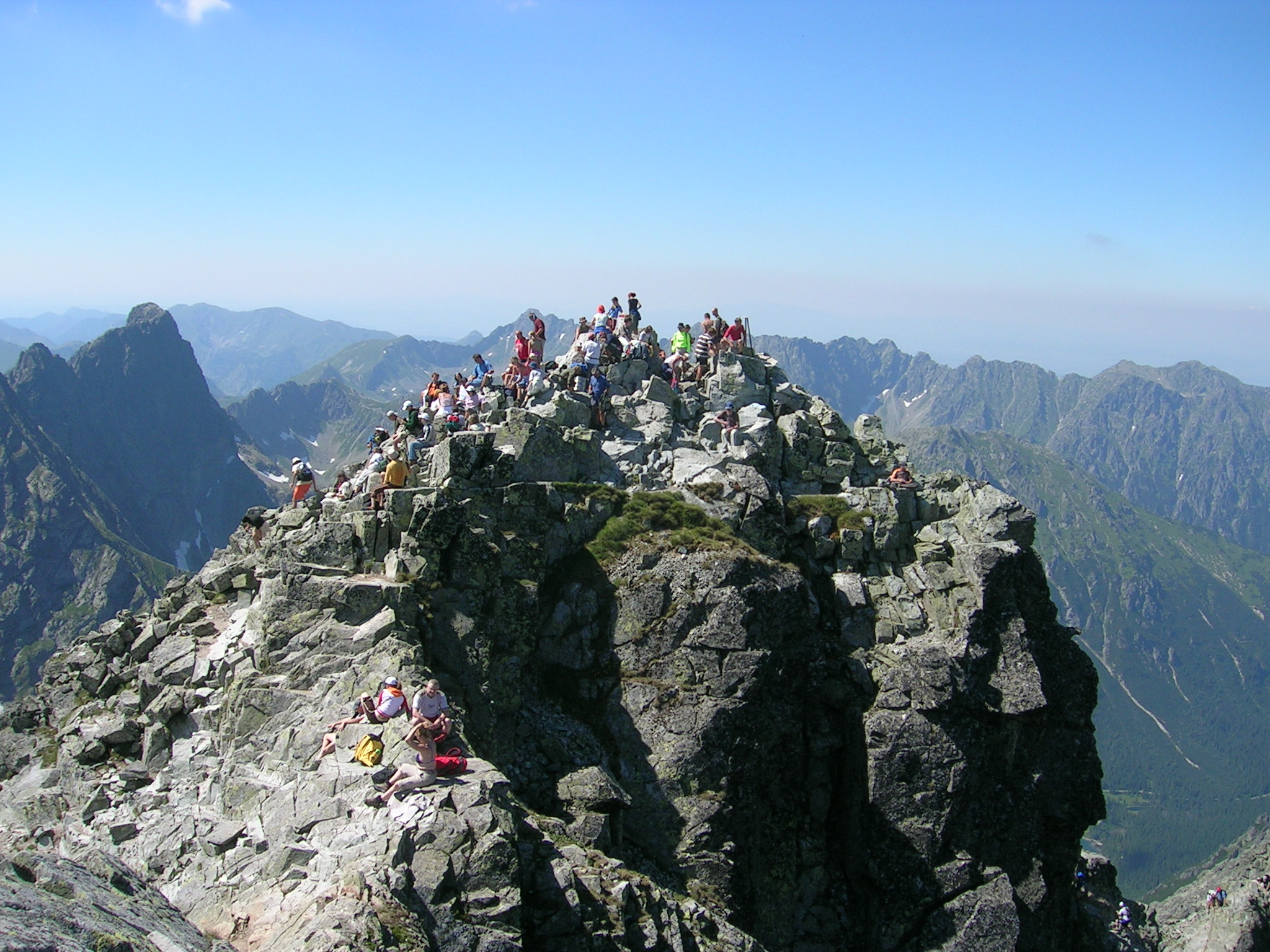
Rysy – border summit

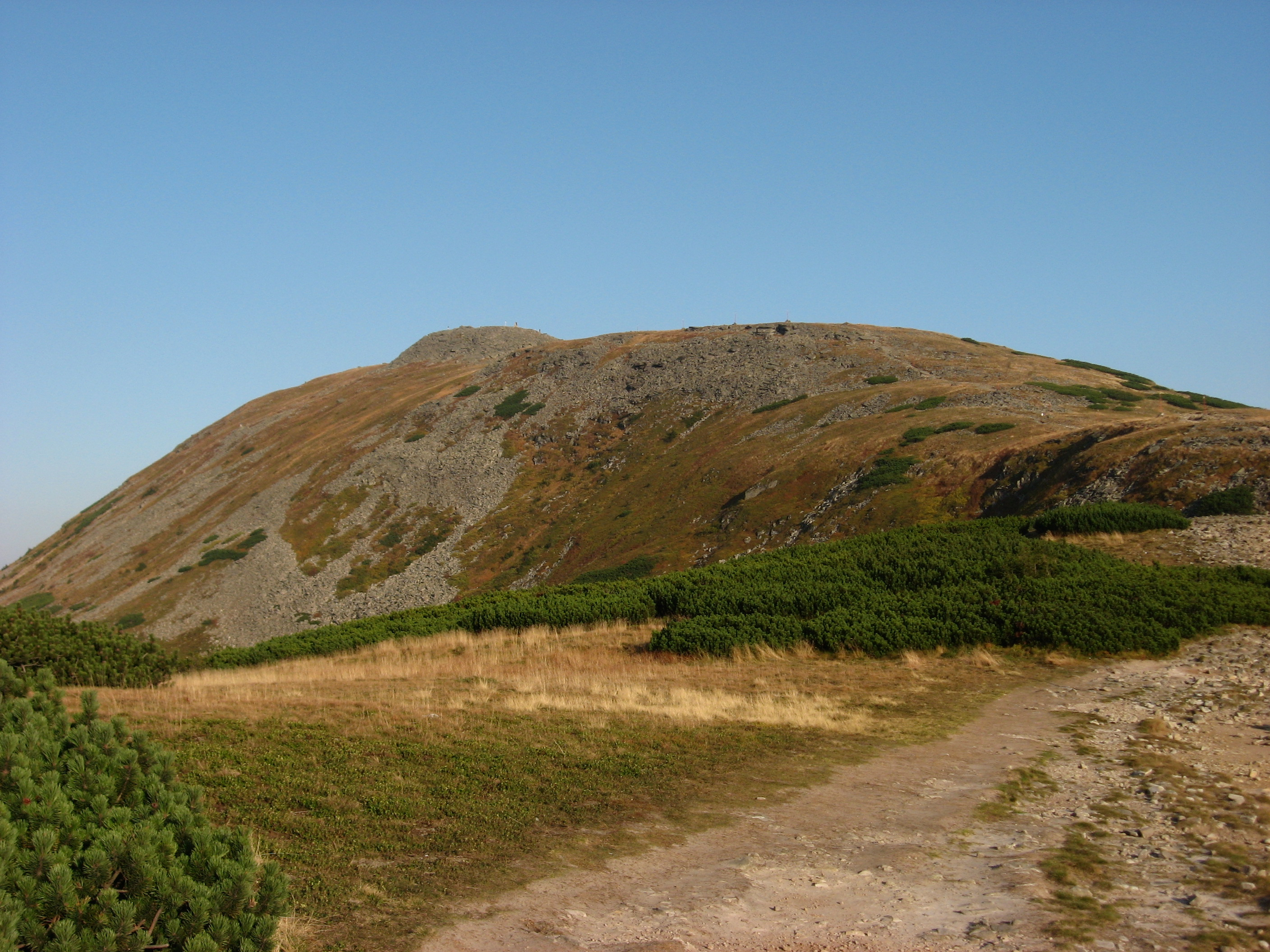
Babia Góra

Śnieżka

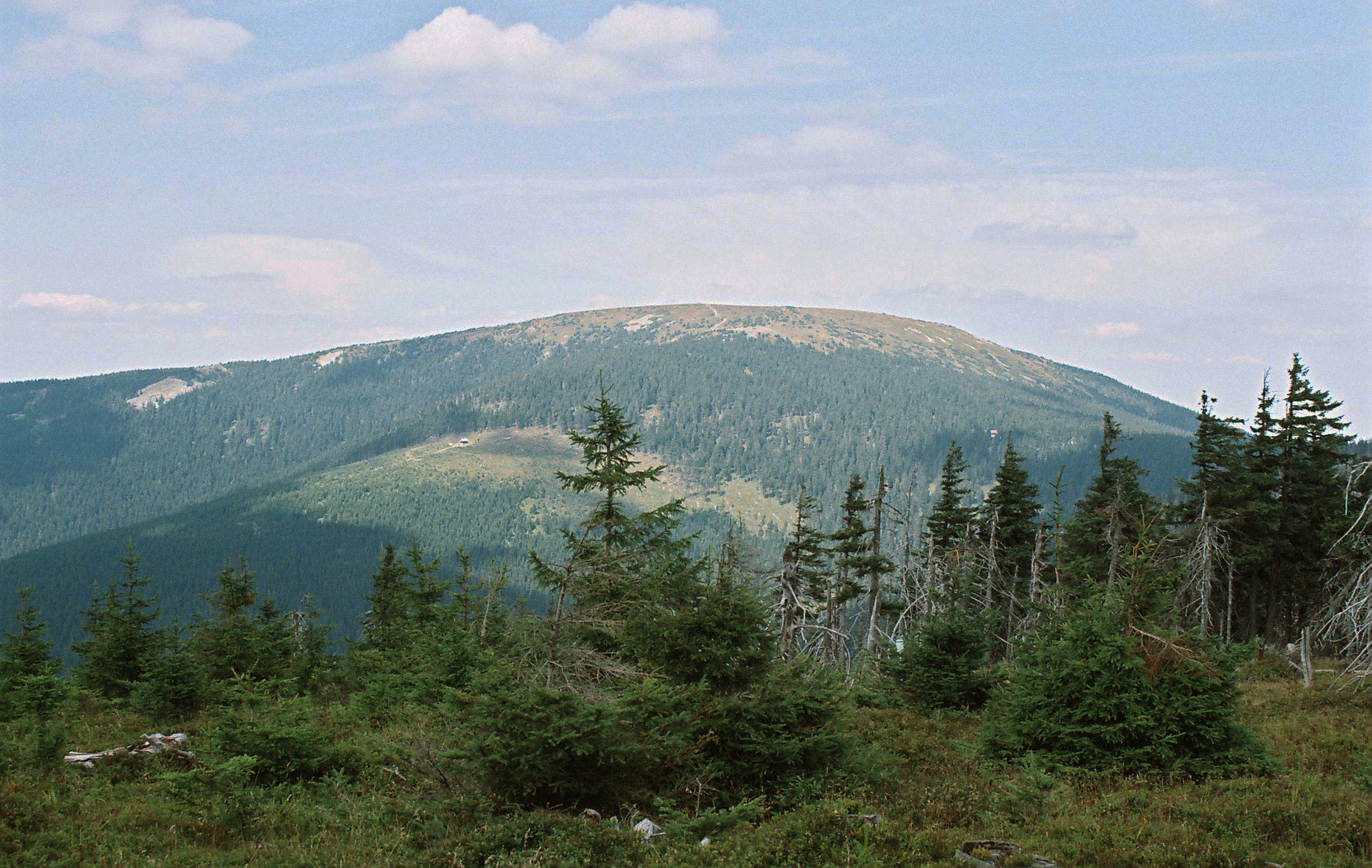
Śnieżnik

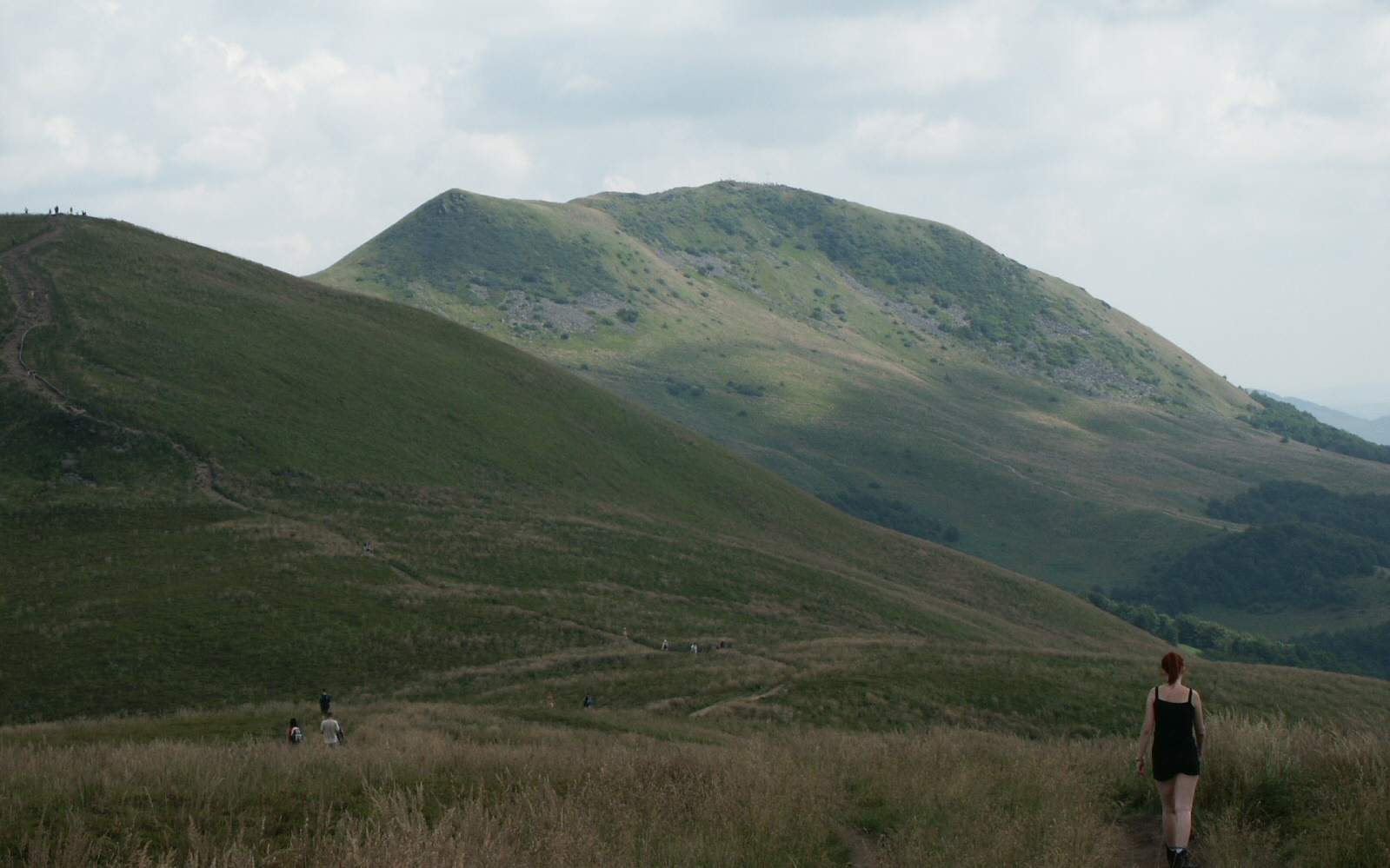
Tarnica

Crown of Polish Mountains (Polish: Korona Gór Polski) – a list of 28 peaks one per each of the mountain ranges of Poland. It was suggested by geographer, traveller and writer Marek Więckowski and Dr. Wojciech Lewandowski in the tourism and local lore magazine Know Your Country. The list was on December 12, 1997 at a meeting convened by the editors of Know Your Country.

The original idea was to be a list containing the highest peak of each range. However it was decided to consider only most prominent peaks which had a marked hiking trail at the time of the compiling of the list. In addition, the authors made several significant mistakes in the selection of peaks, e.g. by omitting some mountain ranges in the rank of a mesoregion, and placing others in the rank of a microregion. According to the new physical and geographical regionalization of Poland published in 2018, there are more peaks in the Crown, e.g. the Tatra Mountains in Poland consist of three mesoregions: the Reglowe Tatras, the Western Tatras and the High Tatras.

== Peaks ==
Lp.	Peak	mountain range	High (m a.s.l.)
1	Rysy	Tatra Mountains	2500
2	Babia Góra	Żywiec Beskids	1725
3	Śnieżka	Giant Mountains	1603
4	Śnieżnik	Śnieżnik Massif	1426
5	Tarnica	Bieszczady Mountains	1346
6	Turbacz	Gorce Mountains	1310
7	Radziejowa	Beskid Sądecki	1262
8	Skrzyczne	Silesian Beskids	1257
9	Mogielica	Island Beskids	1171
10	Wysoka Kopa	Jizera Mountains	1126
11	Rudawiec	Bialskie Mountains	1112
12	Orlica	Orlickie Mountains	1084
13	Wysoka (Wysokie Skałki)	Pieniny	1050
14	Wielka Sowa	Owl Mountains	1015
15	Lackowa	Low Beskids	997
16	Kowadło	Golden Mountains	989
17	Jagodna	Bystrzyckie Mountains	977
18	Skalnik	Rudawy Janowickie	945
19	Waligóra	Stone Mountains	936
20	Czupel	Little Beskids	933
21	Szczeliniec Wielki	Stołowe Mountains	919
22	Lubomir	Maków Beskids	904
23	Biskupia Kopa	Opawskie Mountains	889
24	Chełmiec	Wałbrzych Mountains	851
25	Kłodzka Góra	Bardzkie Mountains	765
26	Skopiec	Kaczawskie Mountains	724
27	Ślęża	Ślęża Massif	718
28	Łysica	Świętokrzyskie Mountains	614

== See also ==
- List of mountains in Poland
- Seven Summits is called literally "Crown of the Earth" in Polish
