= Kalenica =

Mountain in Poland

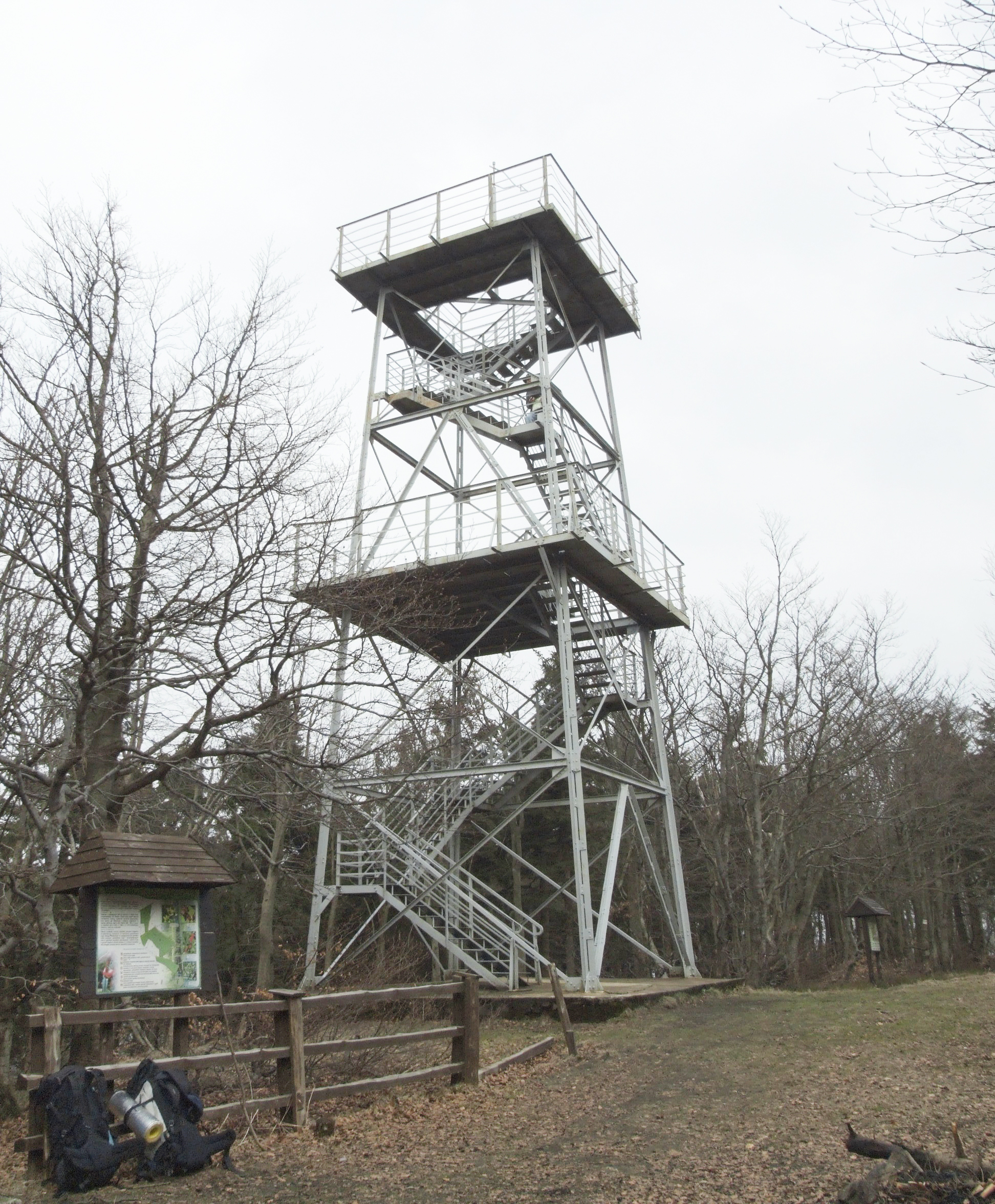
- Observation tower

Highest point
- Elevation: 964 m (3,163 ft)
- Prominence: 163 m (535 ft)
- Coordinates: 50°38′36″N 16°32′48″E

Geography
- Location within Poland
- Location: Lower Silesian Voivodeship, Poland
- Parent range: Owl Mountains

Kalenica (German: Turnberg) is a mountain in the Owl Mountains, part of Central Sudetes. Its height is 964 meters. It lies in Owl Mountains Landscape Park.

The mountain located in Dzierżoniów County, Lower Silesian Voivodeship, in south-western Poland.
