= Wielka Sowa =

Mountain in Owl Mountains

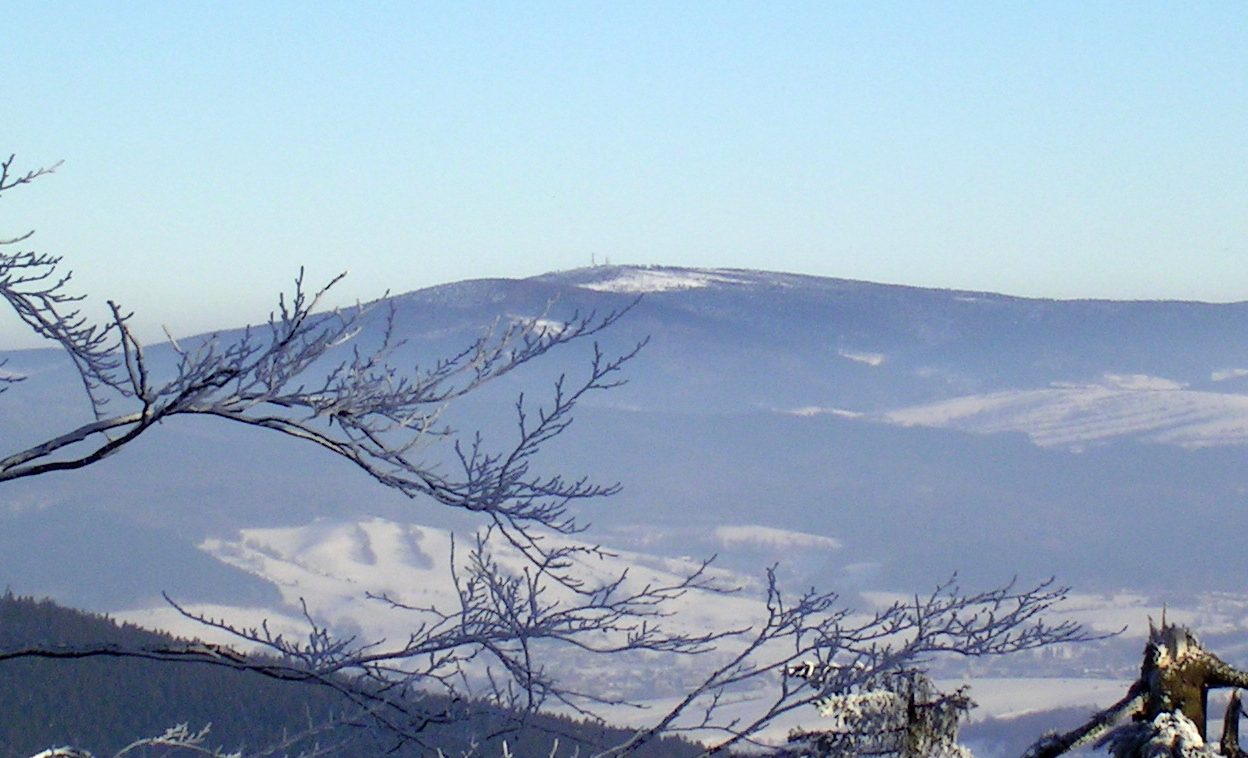
- View from Mt. Waligóra, Niedźwiedzice

Highest point
- Elevation: 1,015 m (3,330 ft)
- Coordinates: 50°40′45″N 16°29′13″E

Geography
- Location within Poland Location within Lower Silesian Voivodeship
- Location: Lower Silesian Voivodeship, Poland
- Parent range: Owl Mountains

Wielka Sowa ("Great Owl") with a height of 1,014.8 metres (3,329 ft) is the highest peak of the Owl Mountains, a range of the Central Sudetes. The mountain is located in Dzierżoniów County, Lower Silesian Voivodeship, in south-western Poland.

== Geography ==
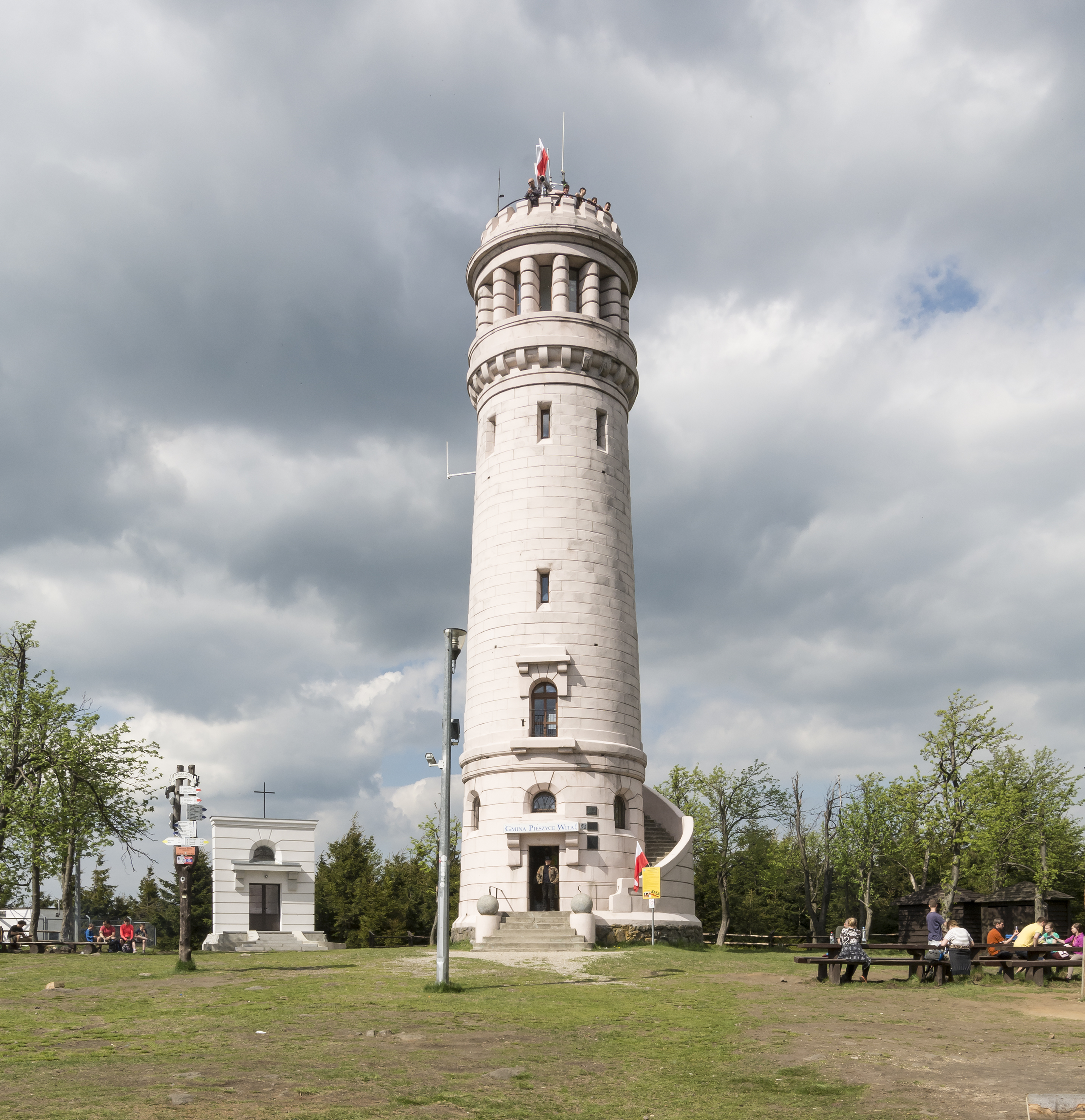
Observation tower

The peak made up of metamorphic rocks of the Precambrian rises above the village of Walim near Dzierżoniów in the north and the Nysa Kłodzka Valley in the west. It is surrounded by the Owl Mountains Landscape Park. Its slopes are a popular skiing area in winter.

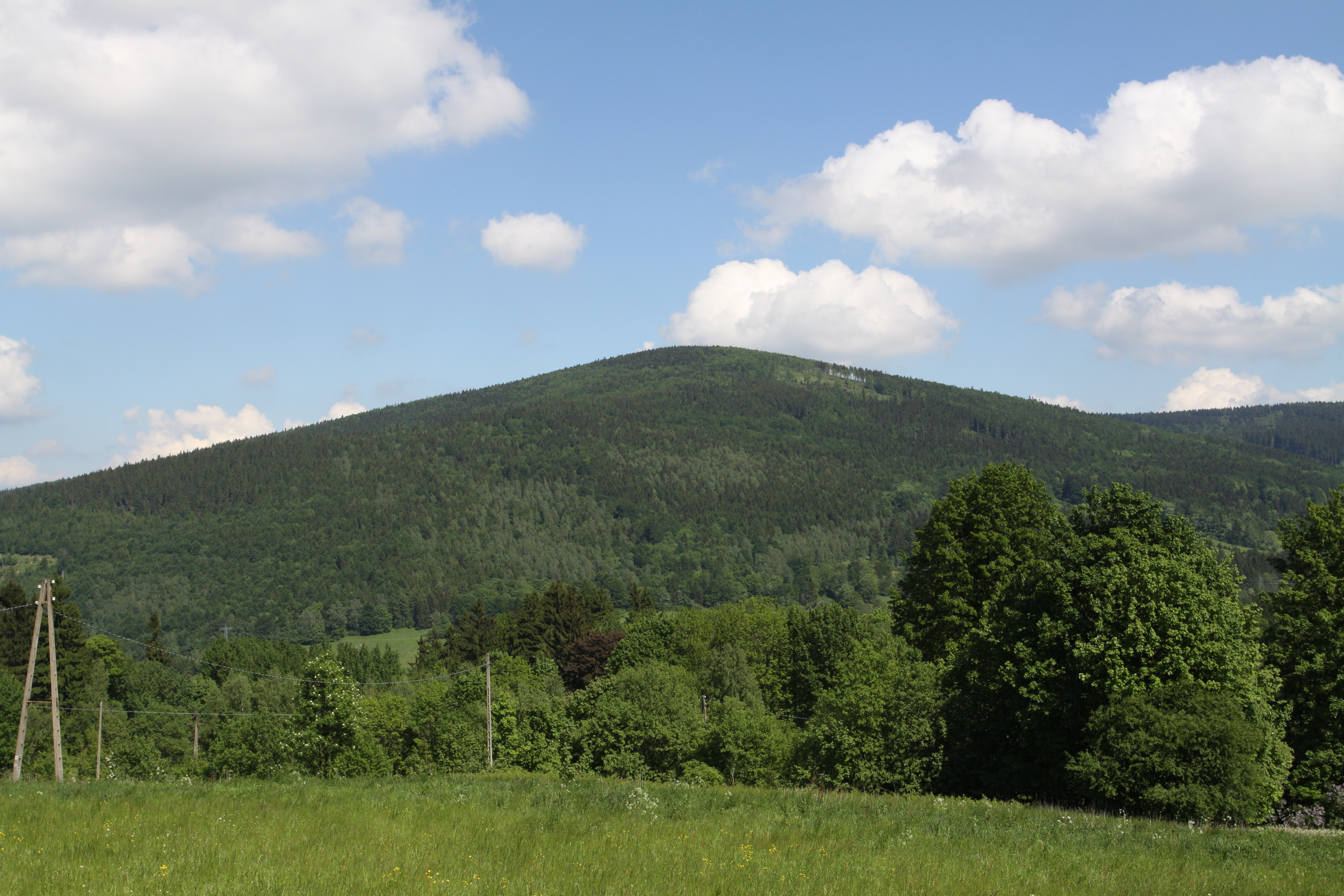
View to Wielka Sova in 2014 from south

In 1906 a Bismarck tower was erected at the summit at the behest of the German authorities. The granite and reinforced concrete construction replaced an older wooden viewing tower located about 30 m (98 ft) to the south. Renamed several times after World War II, it recently has been restored in the course of the EU Interreg incentive program and re-opened in 2008. It is today just called wieża widokowa (observation tower) and offers a panoramic view to the Krkonoše range, to Mount Ślęża, into the Kłodzko Valley and over the Oder Basin in the north up to Wrocław on a bright day.
