= Great Owl =

Great Owl can refer to:

- several species of owl
  - the North African pharaoh eagle-owl (particularly in ancient or antiquarian texts)
  - the great grey owl
  - the American great horned owl
- Wielka Sowa, the highest peak in the Owl Mountains, Poland
- The Great Owl, a character in The Secret of NIMH
