= Kłodzko Valley =

Valley in Poland and the Czech Republic

- Polish: Kotlina Kłodzka; Czech: Kladská kotlina; German: Glatzer Kessel
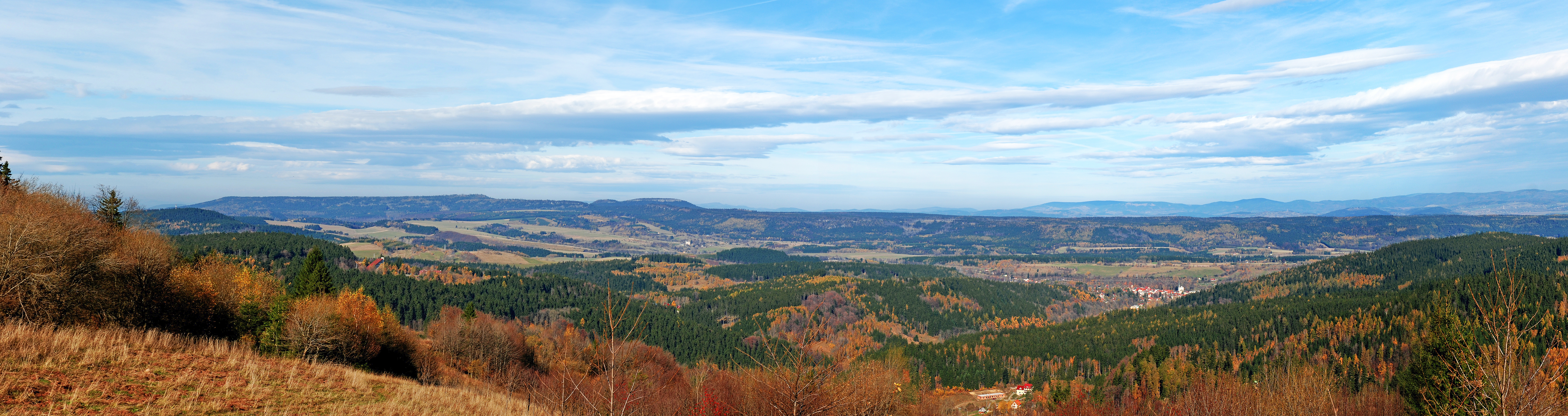
- Kłodzko Valley

Geography
- Countries: Poland; Czech Republic
- States/Provinces: Pardubice Region (Czech Republic); Lower Silesian (Poland)
- Population center: Kłodzko
- Coordinates: 50°15′N 16°40′E
- Mountain range: Sudetes
- River: Eastern Neisse
- Interactive map of Kłodzko Valley

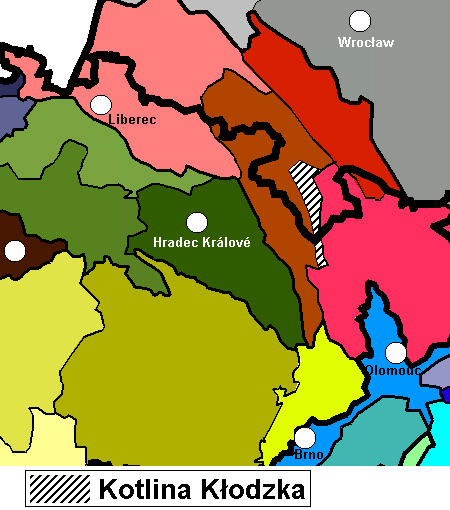
Location of Kłodzko Valley Central Sudetes Eastern Sudetes

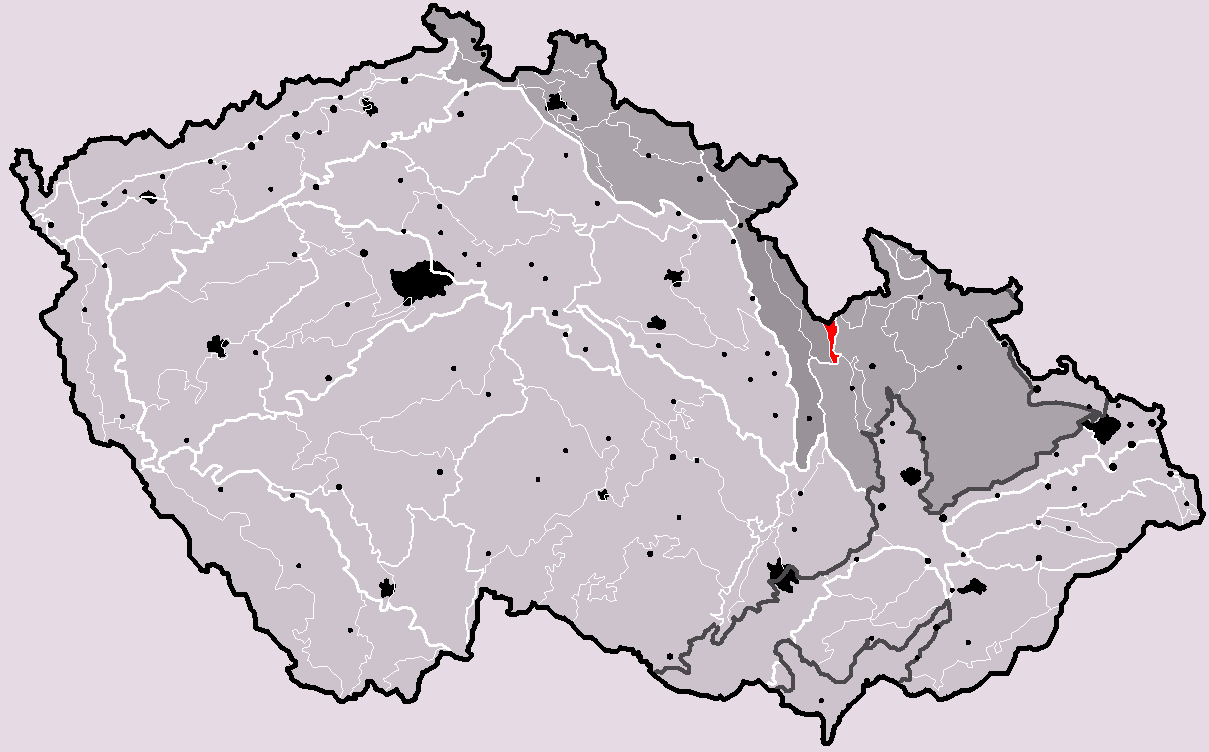
The Czech part of the Kłodzko Valley in the geomorphological system of the Czech Republic

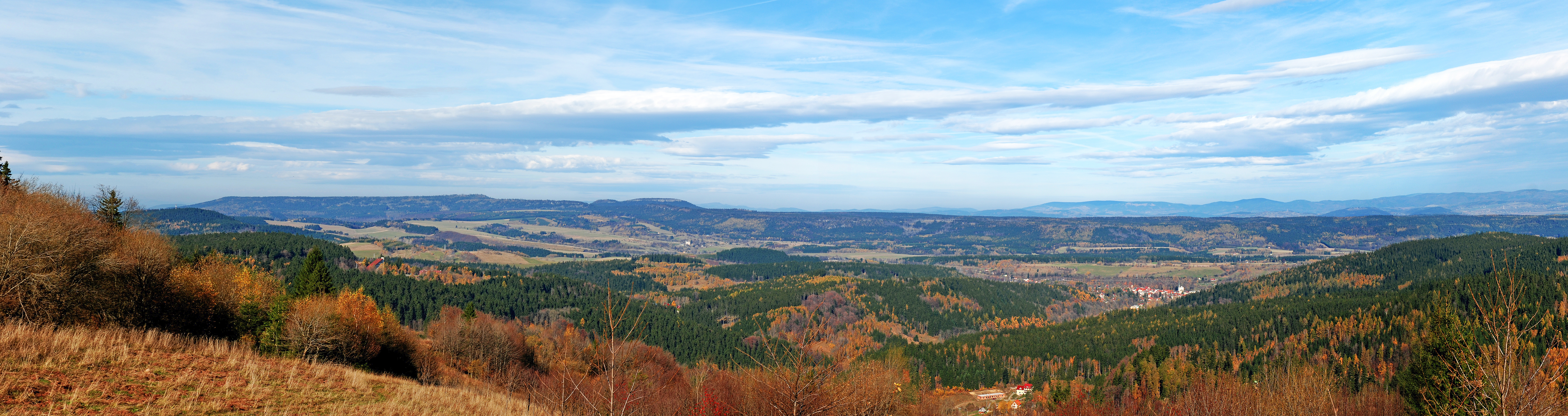
Kłodzko Valley

The Kłodzko Valley (Polish: Kotlina Kłodzka, Czech: Kladská kotlina, German: Glatzer Kessel) is a valley in the Sudetes mountain range that covers the central part of Kłodzko County in south-western Poland, with the southern tip extending to the Czech Republic around the town of Králíky. The chief and largest town in the valley is Kłodzko.

It is traversed by the upper Eastern Neisse river running from south to north and surrounded by the Table Mountains, Bardzkie Mountains and Bystrzyckie Mountains of the Central Sudetes in the west as well as by the Snieznik Mountains, Golden Mountains and Owl Mountains of the Eastern Sudetes in the east. The mountain passes of Kudowa/Běloves in the west and of Międzylesie/Lichkov in the south connect to Czech areas around Náchod and Králíky respectively. Flowing through the valley, the Eastern Neisse is joined by Biała Lądecka, Bystrzyca Dusznicka and Ścinawka rivers, and then exits it in the northeast through the Bardzkie Mountains to Bardo in Lower Silesia.

In ancient times, the Amber Road led through the Kłodzko Valley.

The valley is part of the Kłodzko Land region, which is a tourist destination both in summer and winter, with numerous hotels, sanatoria and many mountain trails.
