= Owl Mountains =

Mountain range in Poland

- Polish: Góry Sowie; Czech: Soví hory; German: Eulengebirge
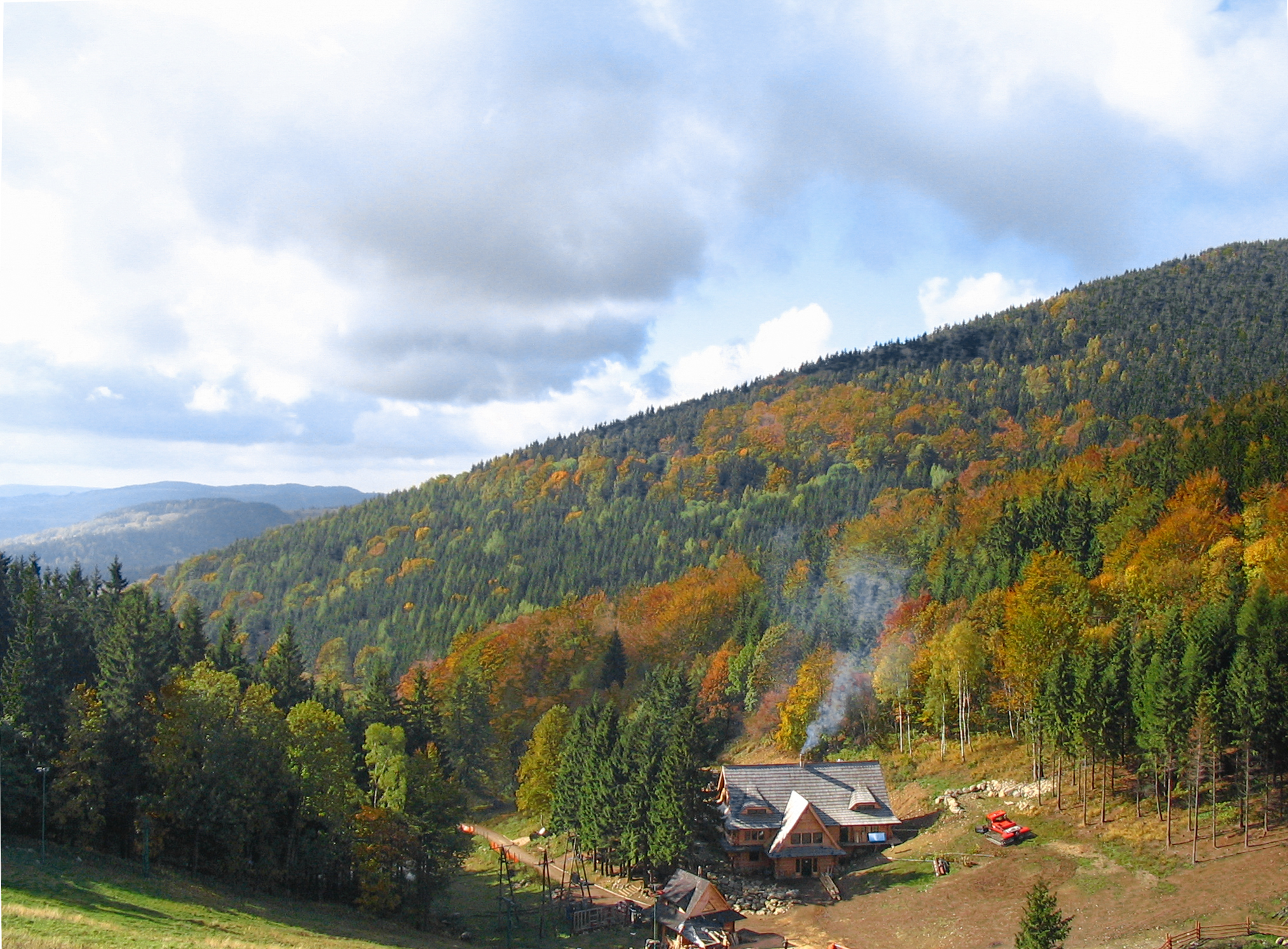
- View from Zygmuntówka Refuge near Jugów

Highest point
- Peak: Wielka Sowa
- Elevation: 1,014.8 m (3,329 ft)
- Coordinates: 50°40′45″N 16°29′13″E

Geography
- Extent of the Owl Mountains
- Country: Poland
- Voivodeship: Lower Silesian
- Range coordinates: 50°40′05″N 16°30′17″E
- Parent range: Central Sudetes
- Borders on: Wałbrzych Mountains and Bardzkie Mountains

Geology
- Rock types: Gneiss and Migmatite

The Owl Mountains (Polish: Góry Sowie) are a mountain range of the Central Sudetes in southwestern Poland. It includes a protected area called Owl Mountains Landscape Park.

== Geography ==
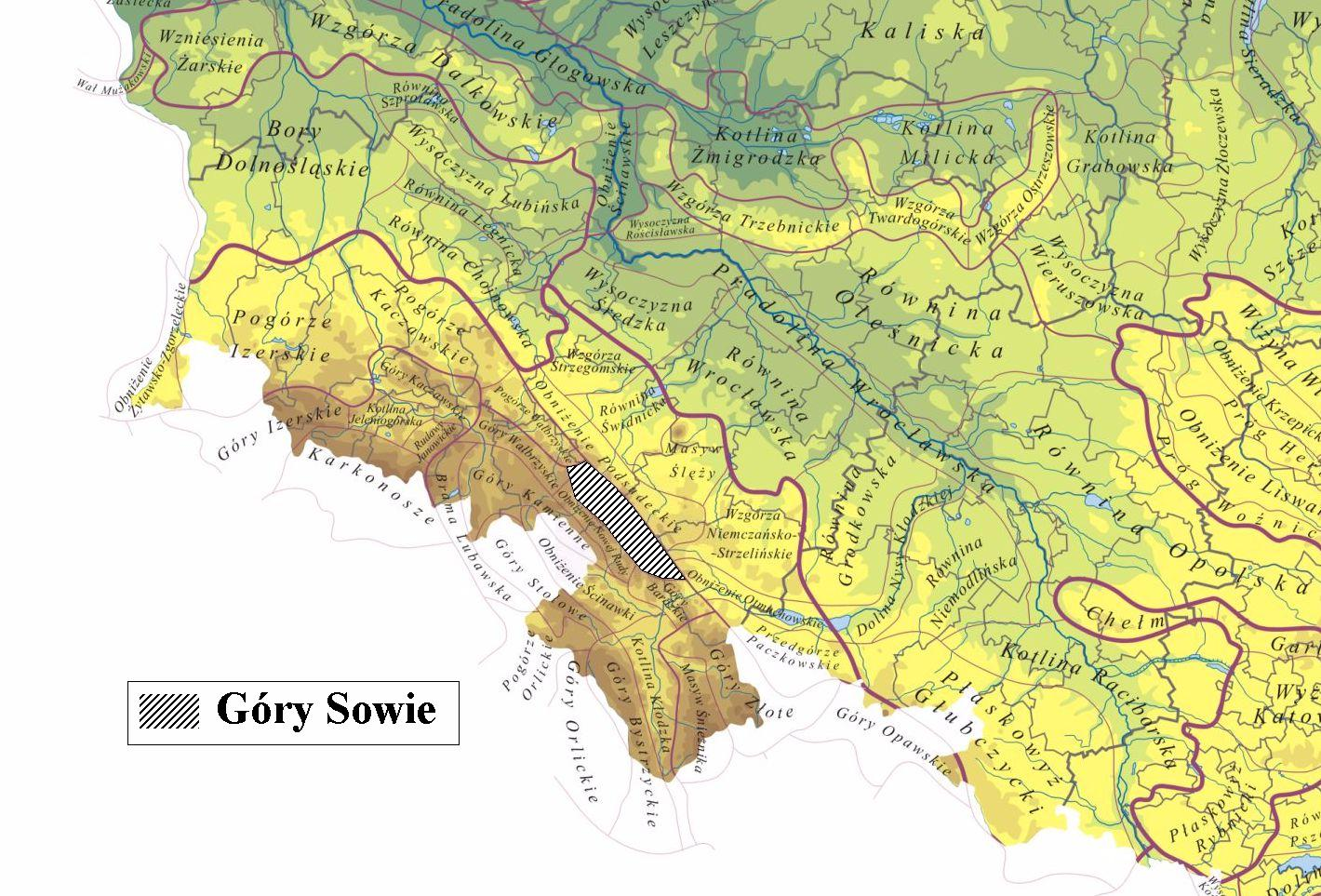
Location in south-western Poland

The Owl Mountains cover an area of about 200 km^{2} (77 mi^{2}) and stretch over 26 km (16 mi) between the historic Lower Silesian region and Kłodzko Land. Apart from the main ridge, the subdivisions of Garb Dzikowca and Wzgórza Wyrębińskie can be distinguished.

The range is bounded by the valley of the Bystrzyca river in the northwest, forming a natural border with the adjacent Wałbrzych Mountains. In the southeast, the border is marked out by Srebrna Góra pass, separating them from the Bardzkie Mountains. In the north, the border is on Kotlina Distrabiekenstein and in the south on Obniżenie Noworudzkie and Włodzickie Hills. In the southwest, the broad Kłodzko Valley stretches to the Table Mountains (Góry Stołowe), the Stone Mountains (Góry Kamienne), and the border with the Czech Republic.

Seen from the Silesian Lowlands in the northeast, the Owl Mountains form a comparatively steep edge of the Central Sudetes, though the range is very diversified in terms of height. The highest peaks are Wielka Sowa ("Great Owl", at 1,014 m (3,327 ft) in altitude) and Kalenica (964 m (3,163 ft)) with their observation towers. Other peaks reach heights from about 600 m (2,000 ft) to 980 m (3,220 ft) metres above sea level.

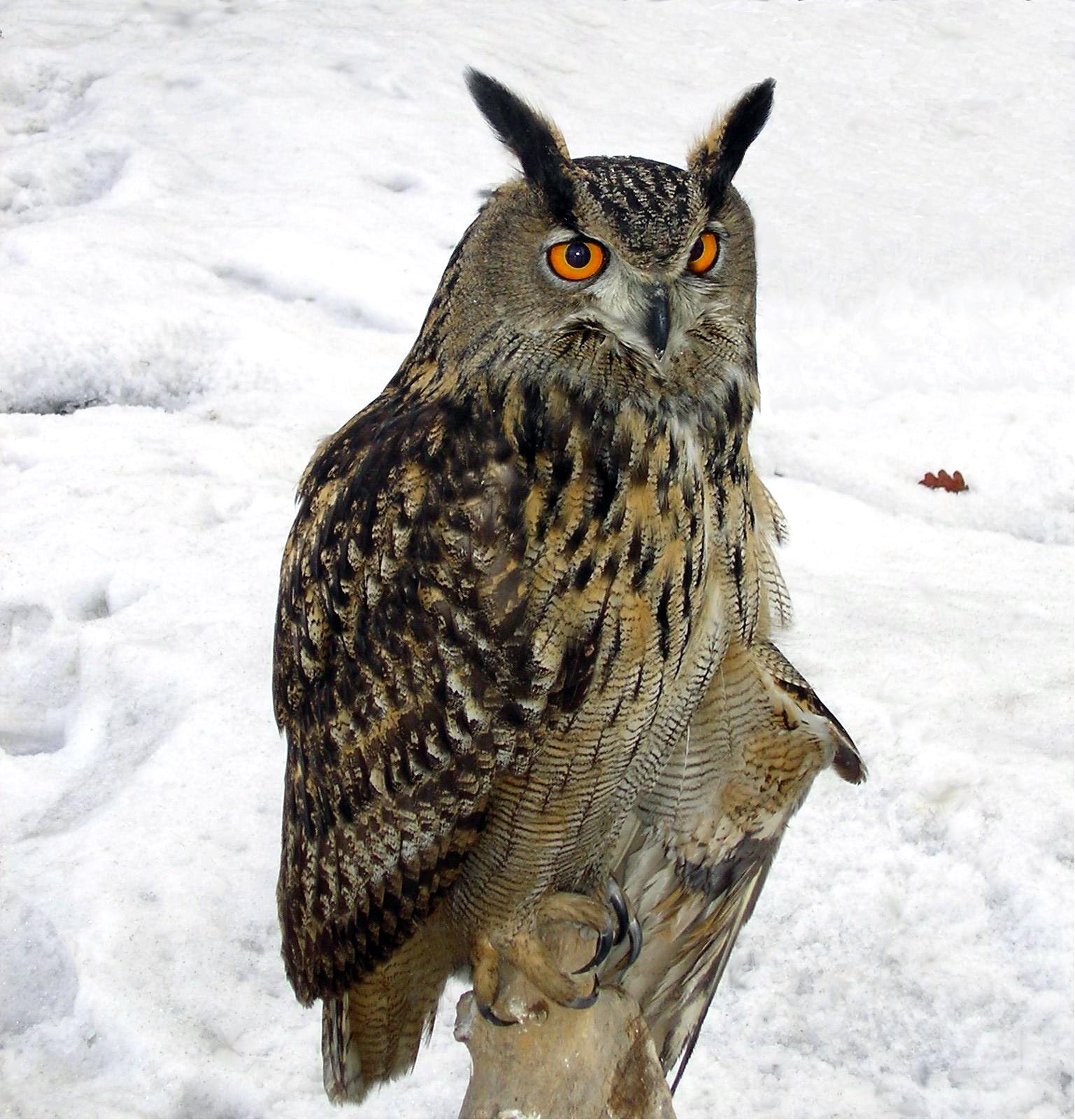
Eurasian eagle-owl

The Precambrian gneiss rocks of the Owl Mountains constitute the oldest part of the Sudetes and are among the oldest in Europe. Other deposits include migmatite rocks, to a lesser extent also amphibolite, serpentinite, granulite, and pegmatite. Except for the summit clearings and the mountain passes, the Owl Mountains represent the spruce-clad type of mountains. There may be also observed a rare natural occurrence of beeches and European yew.

== Project Riese ==
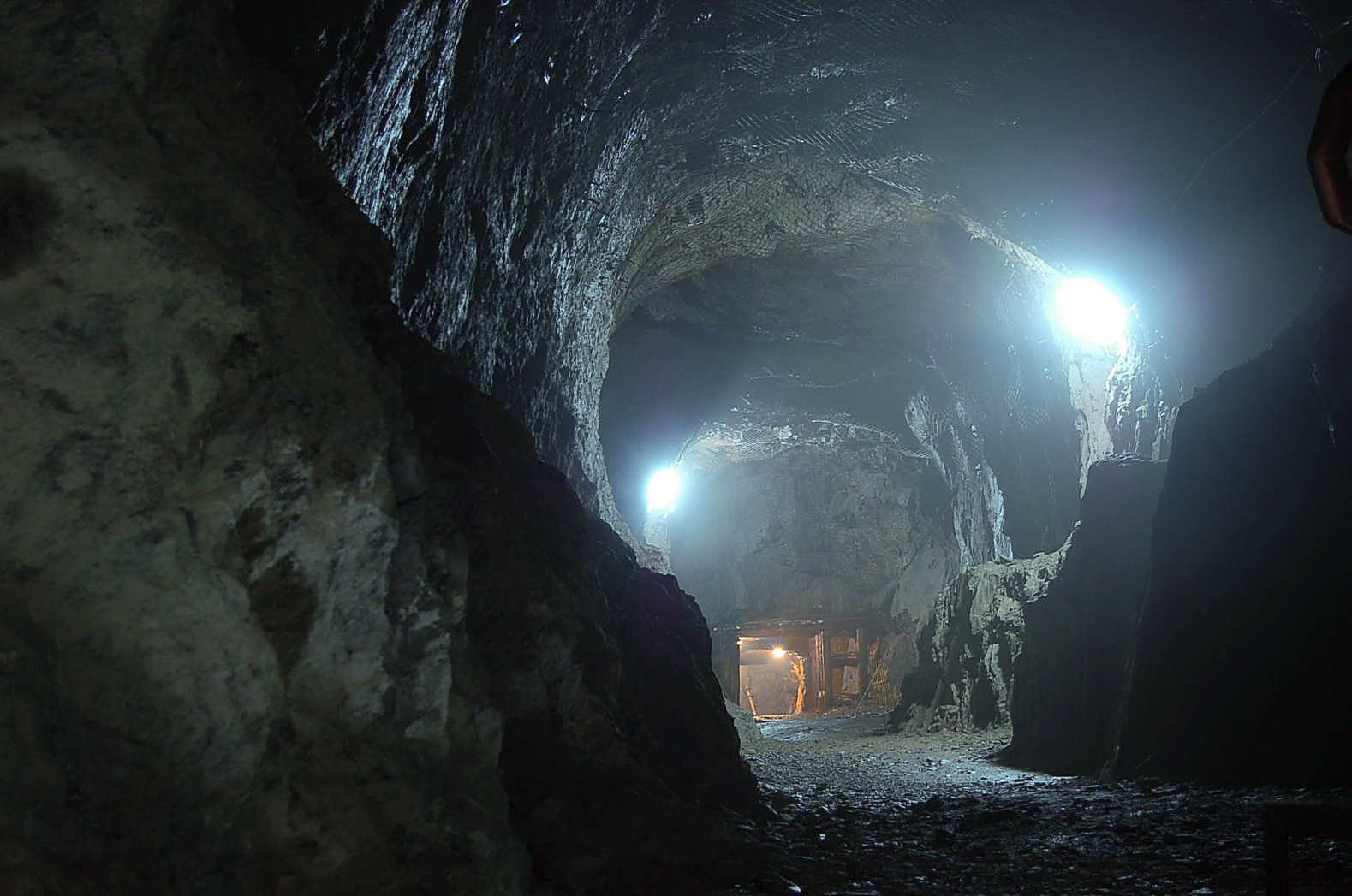
Project Riese

In World War II, a vast tunnel system was driven into the mountains near the village of Wüstewaltersdorf (present-day Walim) at the behest of the Nazi German government. Presumably meant to serve as a Führer Headquarters replacing Wolf's Lair in East Prussia, the adits are linked to another tunnel complex beneath Książ Castle (Schloss Fürstenstein), about 30 km (19 mi) in the northwest, built according to plans by Hermann Giesler. Parts of the extended complex are accessible and can be visited as part of a guided tour.

== Tourism ==
Located about 75 km (47 mi) south of the regional capital Wrocław, the picturesque Owl Mountains are a popular destination for hikers and day-trippers. At the foot of the range are well-known tourist places, like: Rzeczka, Walim at the Wielka Sowa massif, Sokolec, Jugów, Sierpnica, and Zagórze Śląskie.

The mountains are covered by a network of tourist trails, including the "red trail", leading through most of Europe. Other destinations include: the Stone Tower on Wielka Sowa and the viewing tower on Kalenica, Fort Srebrna Góra, Grodno Castle in Zagórze Śląskie, the adit complexes of Project Riese near Walim and the Mining Museum in Poland. Major towns at the foot of the Owl Mountains include Bielawa, Dzierżoniów, Głuszyca, Jedlina-Zdrój, Nowa Ruda, Pieszyce, and Srebrna Góra.

== See also ==
- Eulengebirgsbahn
