= Bystrzyca Łomnicka =

River in Poland

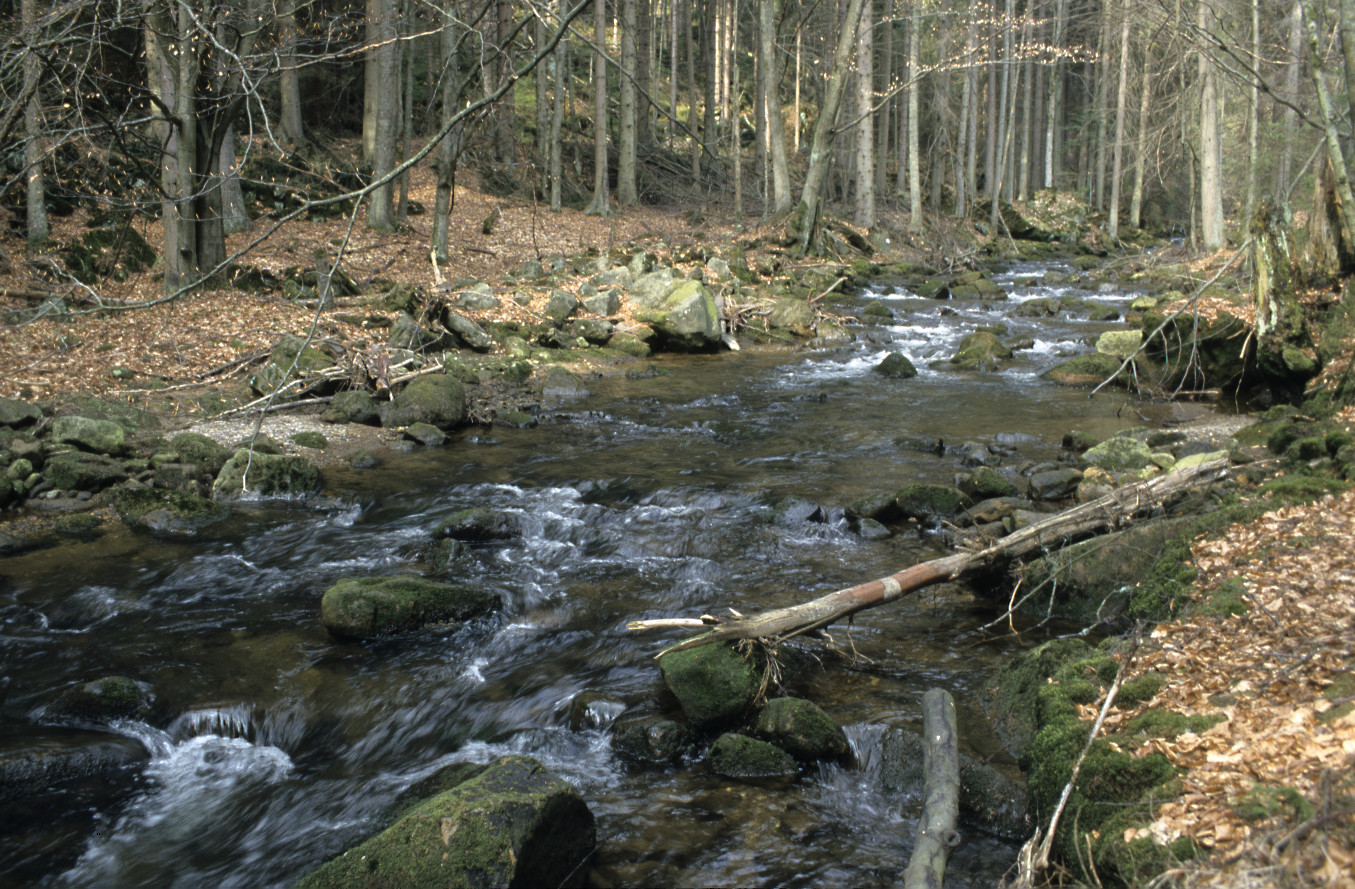
- Bystrzyca Łomnicka in Bystrzyckie Mountains

Location
- Country: Poland

Physical characteristics
- Mouth
  - location: Eastern Neisse
  - coordinates: 50.2955°N 16.6517°E
- Length: 25 km (16 mi)

Basin features
- Progression: Eastern Neisse→ Oder→ Baltic Sea

Bystrzyca Łomnicka (German: Kressen Bach Weistritz, Weistritz, Hungarian: Lomnici-Beszterce) is a river in south-western Poland. It is a left tributary of the Nysa Kłodzka (Eastern Neisse) and is about 25.5 km long.

Its sources are located in the northern Bystrzyckie Mountains. It enters Nysa Kłodzka in Bystrzyca Kłodzka.
