= Central Sudetes =

Mountain range in the Czech Republic and Poland

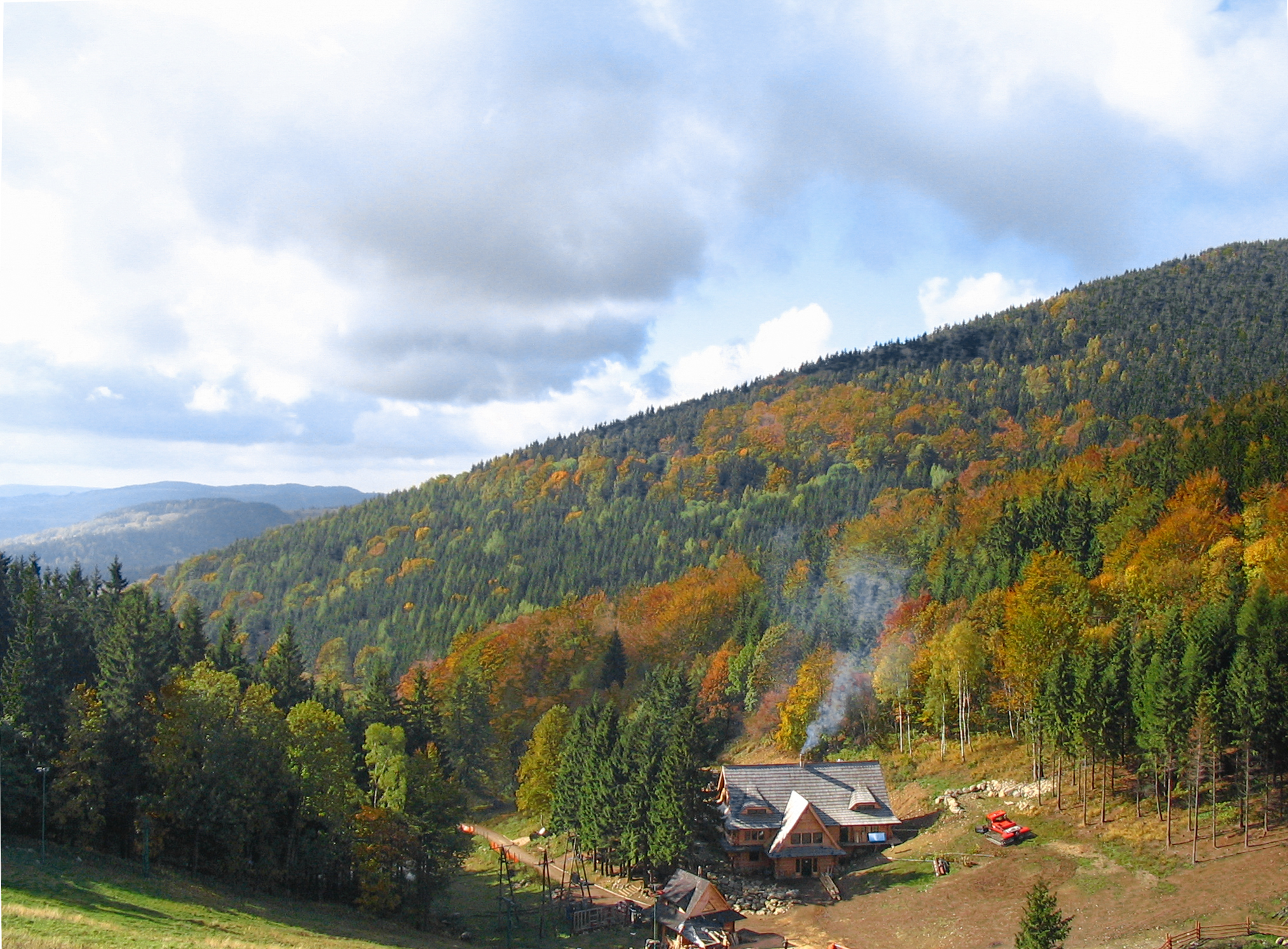
- View from Zygmuntówka refuge, Owl Mountains

Highest point
- Peak: Velká Deštná
- Elevation: 1,116 m (3,661 ft)
- Coordinates: 50°18′18″N 16°23′56.7″E

Geography
- Divisions of the Sudetes range system, Central Sudetes marked in yellow
- Countries: Czech Republic and Poland
- States: Bohemia, Moravia (Czech Rep.) and Lower Silesia, Opole (Poland)
- Parent range: Sudetes range system

The Central Sudetes (Czech: Orlická oblast or Střední Sudety, Polish: Sudety Środkowe, German: Mittelsudeten) are the central part of the Sudetes mountain range on the border of the Czech Republic and Poland. They stretch from the Nysa Kłodzka River and the Kłodzko Valley in the east to the upper Bóbr in the west.

The Central Sudetes comprise a number of mountain ranges, including:

- Orlické Mountains
- Bystrzyckie Mountains
- Bardzkie Mountains
- Owl Mountains
- Krucze Mountains
- Stone Mountains
- Stołowe Mountains
- Wałbrzych Mountains

The largest city in the Central Sudetes is Wałbrzych in Poland, where there are extensive hard coal deposits under the Wałbrzyskie and partly Owl Mountains.

== History ==
During World War II, Nazi Germany established and operated multiple subcamps of the Gross-Rosen concentration camp in the Central Sudetes, and several were part of Project Riese.

== Literary Heights Festival ==
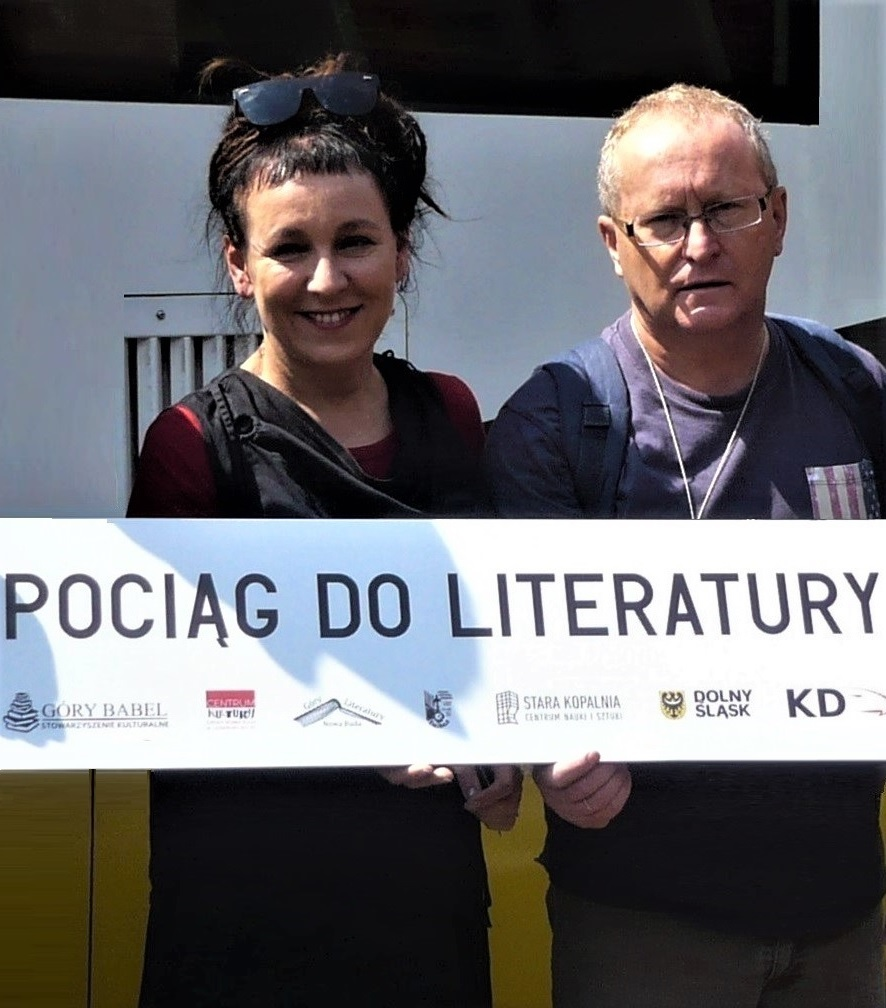
Olga Tokarczuk and Karol Maliszewski during the Literary Heights Festival in 2018.

The Literary Heights Festival, a Polish literary festival founded in 2015 which takes place in the vicinity of Nowa Ruda at the foot of the Owl Mountains in the Kłodzko Valley.

The event's organizers include the Mount Babel Cultural Association, the city and commune of Nowa Ruda, while the hosts are Karol Maliszewski and Olga Tokarczuk, who lives in Krajanów. The festival's program includes educational sessions, debates, concerts, panels, shows, meetings, poetry, literary workshops, film screenings, culinary workshops and various exhibitions.

== See also ==
- Eastern Sudetes
- Western Sudetes

== Bibliography ==
- M. Staffa (1982): Przewodnik turystyczny: Wędrówka przez Sudety Środkowe: Góry Wałbrzyskie – Góry Suche – Góry Sowie – Góry Bardzkie. Wyd. PTTK "Kraj": Warszawa/Krakow ISBN 8300004769
- K. Radwański, M. Szymczak (2008): Atlas gór Polski: Sudety. Karpaty. Góry Świętokrzyskie. Wyda. ExpressMap: Warszawa ISBN 83-6012-064-1
- Praca zbiorowa: Mapa Sudety Środkowe (scale 1:40 000). Wydawnictwo Turystyczne Plan: Jelenia Góra ISBN 83-60044-44-9
- M. Mota (1998): Sudety Środkowe, Wschodnie i Kotlina Kłodzka (A. Rajwa Geologia i rzeźba; C. Skała Geografia i przyroda); Wyd."Pascal": Bielsko-Biała ISBN 838769603X
