= Wałbrzych Mountains =

Mountain range in Poland

Coordinates: 50°40′N 16°10′E

- Waldenburg Mountains
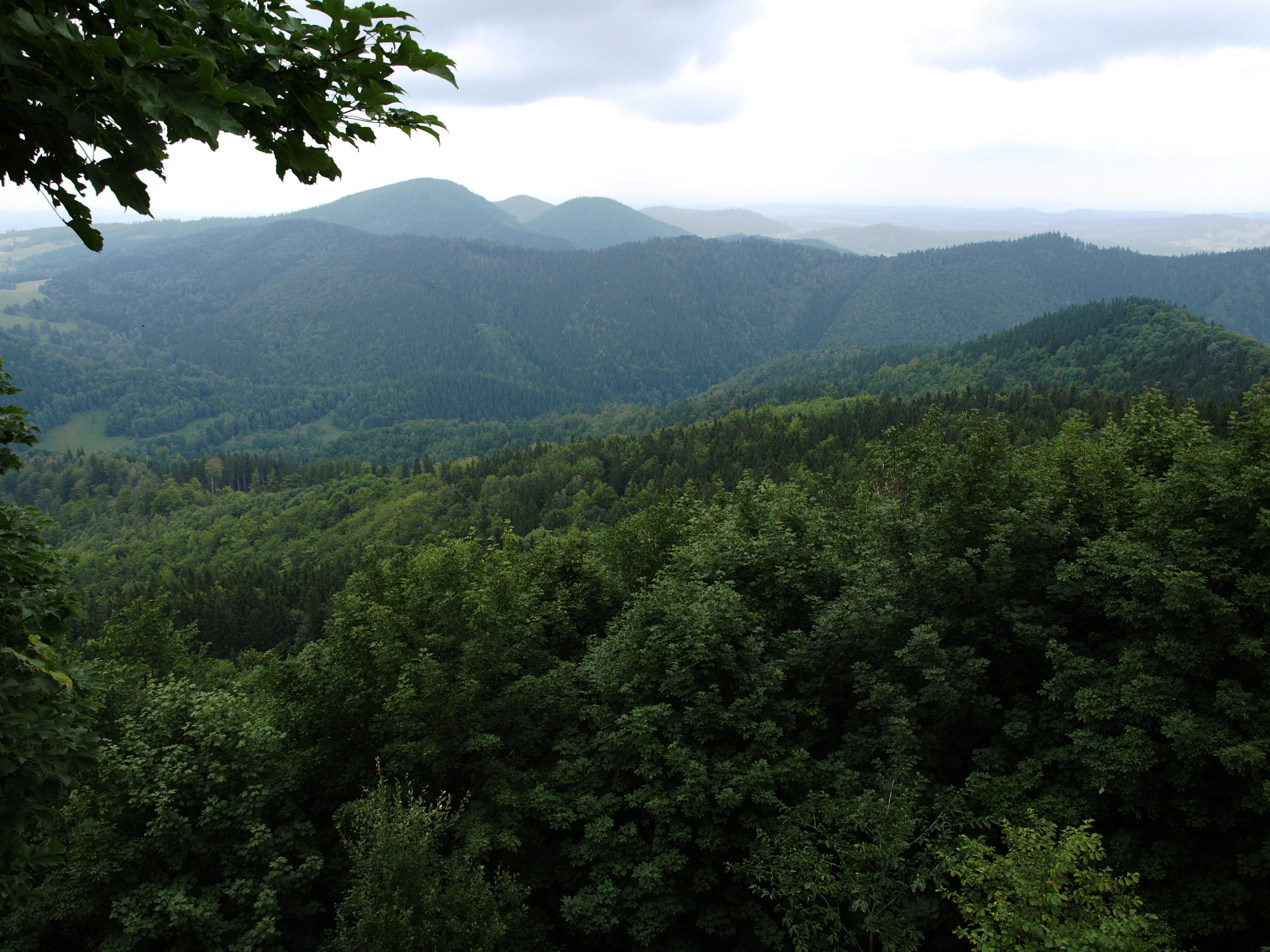
- View of the Black Mountains

Highest point
- Peak: Borowa
- Elevation: 853

Geography
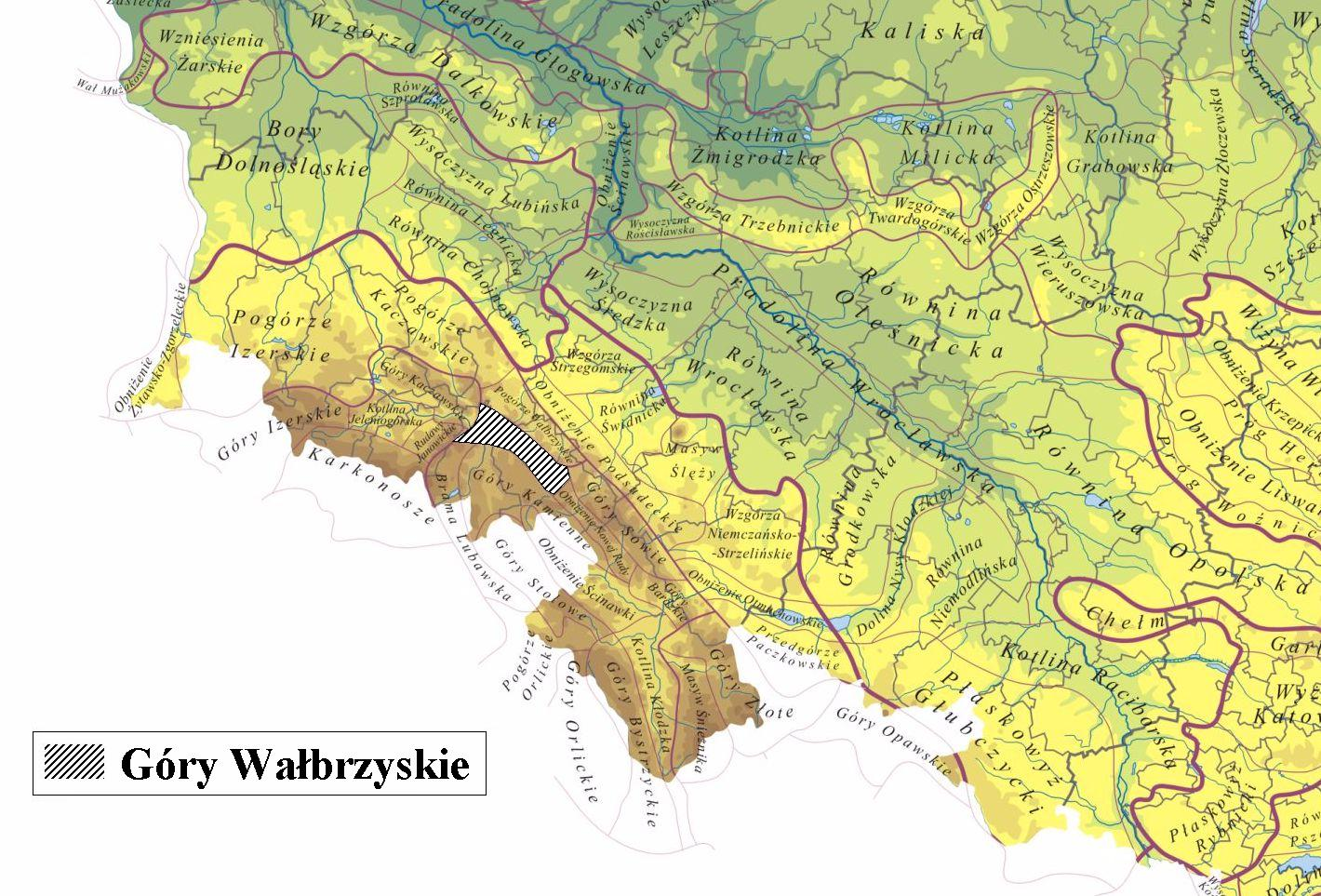
- Country: Poland
- Voivodeship: Lower Silesian
- Parent range: Central Sudetes

The Wałbrzych Mountains or Waldenburg Mountains (Polish: Góry Wałbrzyskie) is one of the three mountain ranges that form the western part of the Central Sudetes.

== Geography ==
The Wałbrzych Mountains lie almost entirely within Poland. Several southern ridges reach as far as the Czech Republic. The range extends to the west and southwest of the city of Wałbrzych.

The Wałbrzych Mountains are surrounded by several mountain ranges: the Wałbrzych Highlands to the northeast, the Owl Mountains to the east, the Włodzickie Hills to the southeast, the Stone Mountains to the southwest, the Broumov Highlands and the Rudawy Janowickie to the west, and the Kaczawskie Mountains to the northwest.

The Wałbrzych Mountains are divided into three sub-regions:

- Trójgarb and Krąglak Massif
- Chełmiec Massif
- Black Mountains

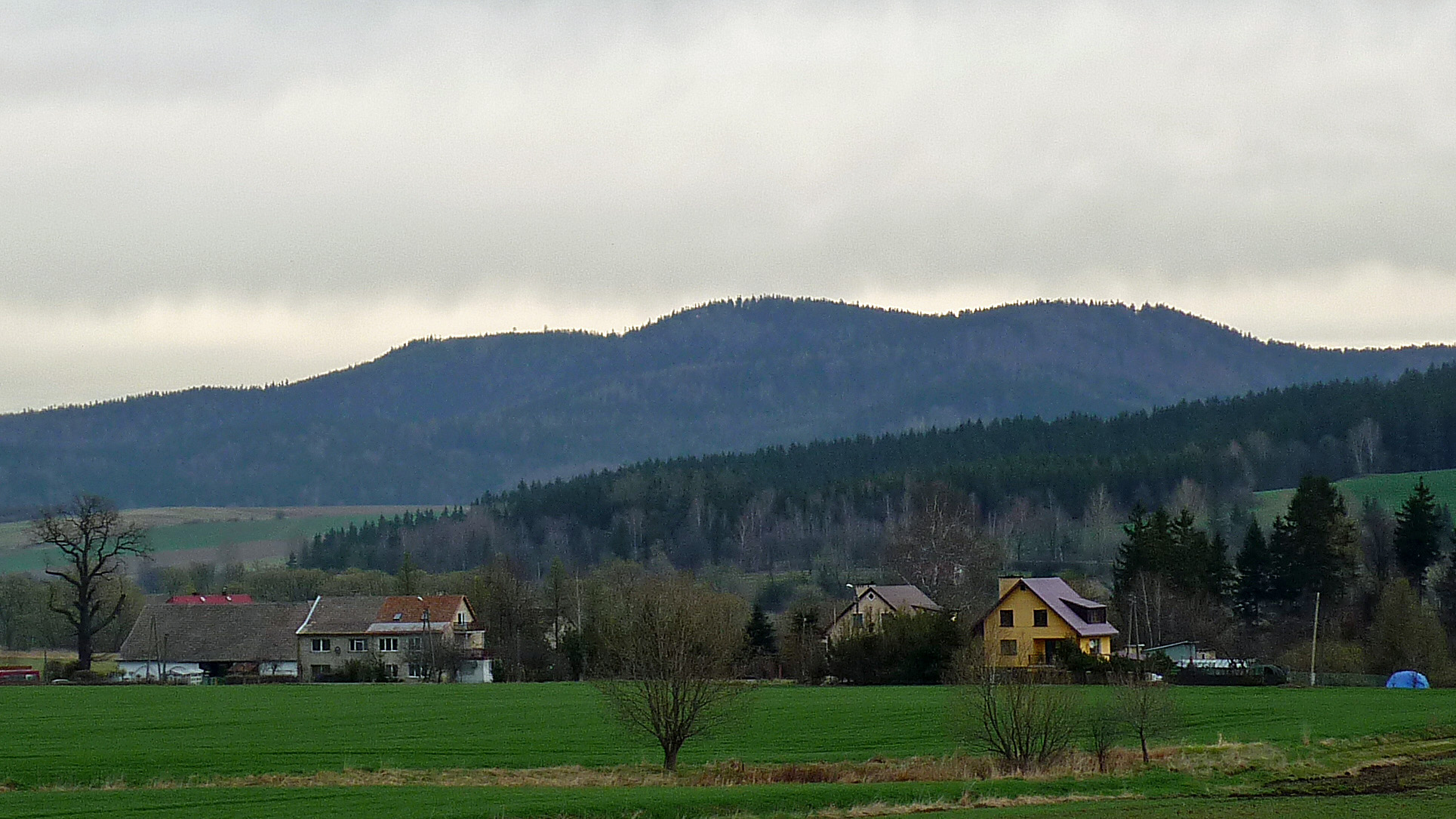
Trójgarb

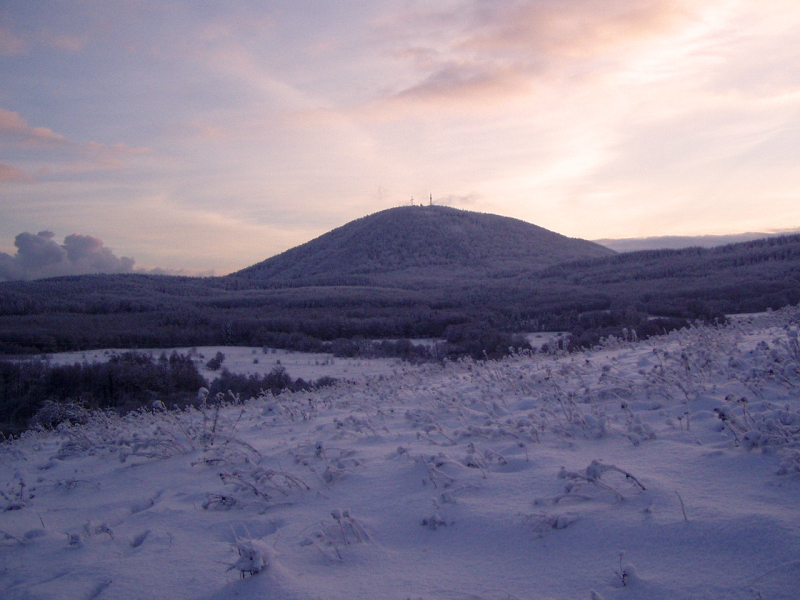
Chełmiec

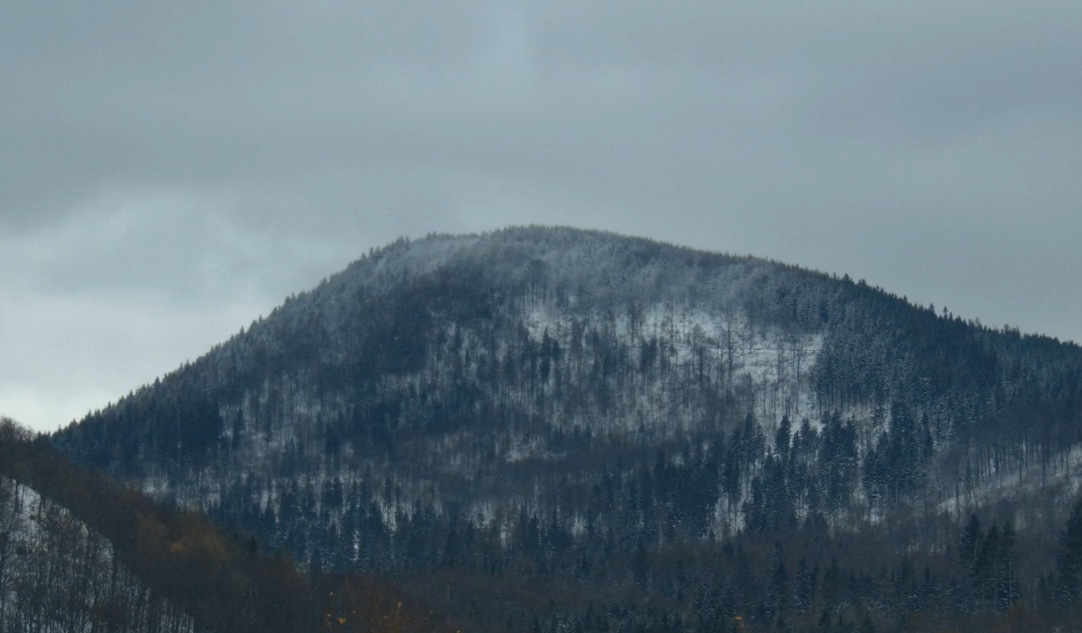
Borowa
