= Bystrzyckie Mountains =

Mountain range in Poland

Coordinates: 50°15′07″N 16°34′00″E

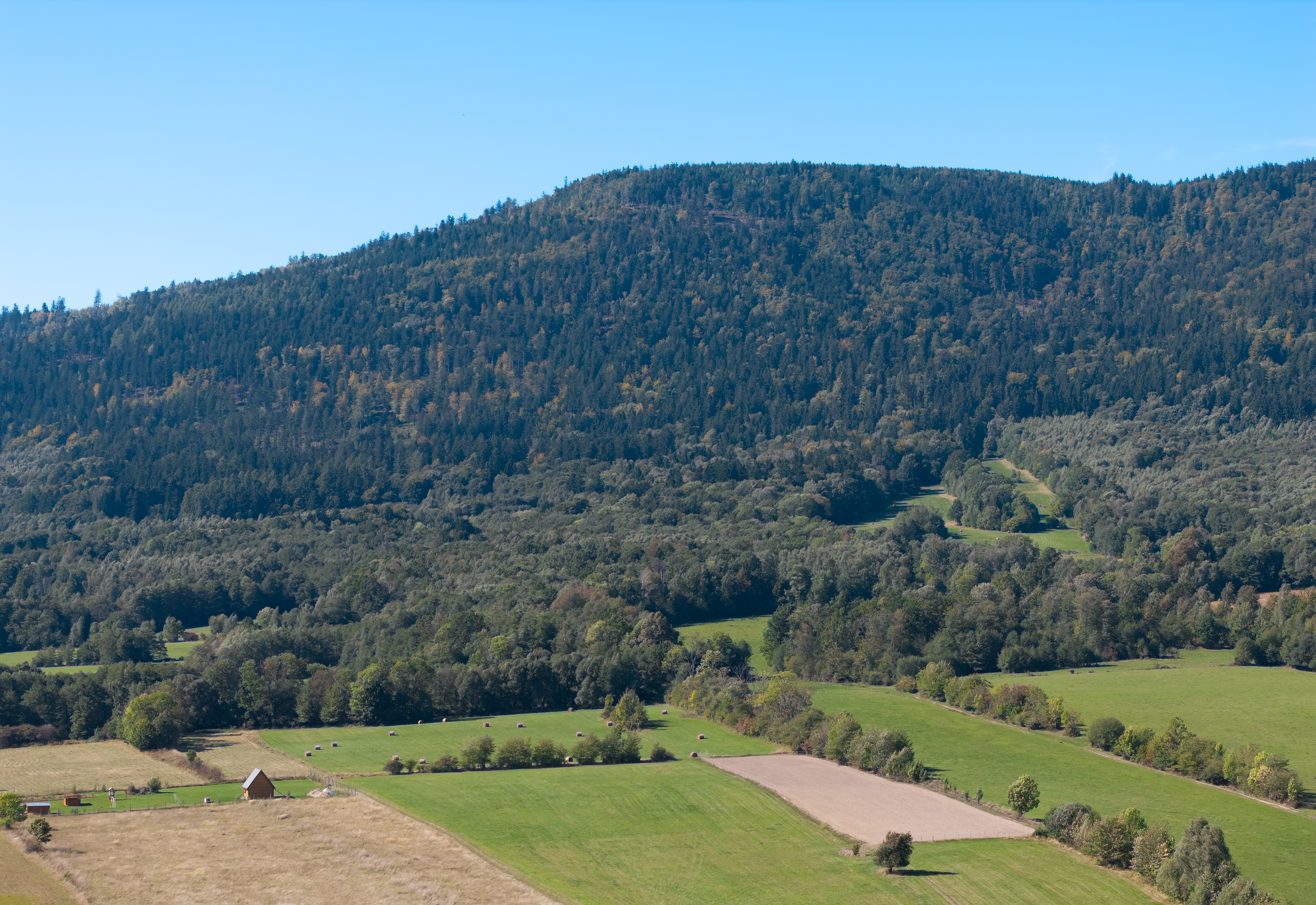
- Summit area of Jagodna in the Bystrzyckie Mountains

Highest point
- Peak: Jagodna
- Elevation: 977 m (3,205 ft)

Naming
- Native name: Polish: Góry Bystrzyckie

Geography
- Country: Poland
- Voivodeship: Lower Silesian
- County (powiat): Kłodzko
- Parent range: Central Sudetes

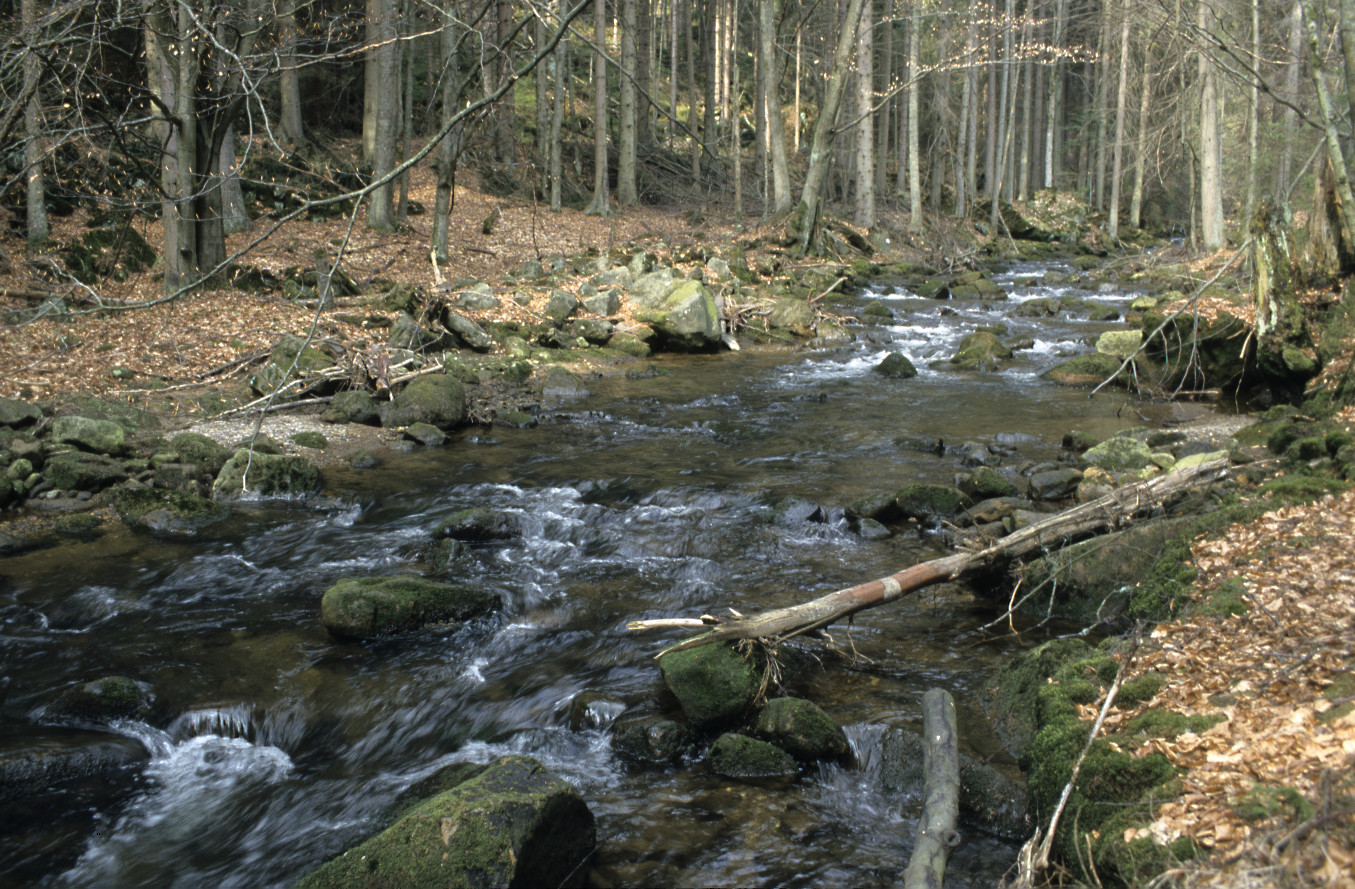
The Bystrzyca Łomnicka River in the Bystrzyckie Mountains

The Bystrzyckie Mountains (Polish: Góry Bystrzyckie; Czech: Bystřické hory; German: Habelschwerdter Gebirge) are a mountain range in south-western Poland and form part of the Central Sudetes. The range lies in the Lower Silesian Voivodeship, mainly within Kłodzko County, and occupies the western part of the region surrounding the Kłodzko Valley. In the modern physico-geographical regionalisation of Poland the range is classified as the mesoregion Góry Bystrzyckie (332.53).

== Geography ==
The Bystrzyckie Mountains are characterised by broad, forested ridges and relatively gentle slopes compared with the higher ranges of the Sudetes. Much of the area is covered by coniferous forest, with scattered clearings and small valleys carved by mountain streams.

Administratively the range lies within the municipalities of Bystrzyca Kłodzka, Lewin Kłodzki, Międzylesie, Szczytna, Duszniki-Zdrój and Polanica-Zdrój. The surrounding forests are managed largely by the State Forests administration (Lasy Państwowe), especially the Nadleśnictwo Bystrzyca Kłodzka forest district.

== Highest points ==
The highest part of the range lies around the massif of Jagodna. The summit of Jagodna reaches about 977 metres above sea level and forms the highest clearly defined peak of the Bystrzyckie Mountains.

Modern analyses of elevation data suggest that a nearby point known as Jagodna Północna reaches approximately 984.5 metres above sea level.

Near Przełęcz Spalona stands the mountain hut Schronisko PTTK "Jagodna", located at about 811 metres above sea level and serving as a base for hiking and winter tourism in the area.

== Geology ==
Geologically the Bystrzyckie Mountains belong to the crystalline basement of the Sudetes. Their geological structure has been described in publications of the Polish Geological Institute.

== Conservation ==
A large part of the mountains lies within the protected landscape area "Góry Bystrzyckie i Orlickie", established by regulation of the Lower Silesian Voivode. The protected area covers about 22,500 hectares.

== Bibliography ==
- Staffa, M. (ed.), 1992: Słownik geografii turystycznej Sudetów. Tom 14. Góry Bystrzyckie, Góry Orlickie. PTTK "Kraj", Warszawa–Kraków. ISBN 83-7005-095-6
- Staffa, M. (ed.), 1994: Słownik geografii turystycznej Sudetów. Tom 15. Kotlina Kłodzka i Rów Górnej Nysy. I-BIS, Wrocław. ISBN 83-85773-06-1
- Czerwiński, J., 2003: Sudety. Przewodnik. Kartogr. Eko-Graf, Wrocław.
