= Owl Mountains Landscape Park =

Protected area in Poland

- Park Krajobrazowy Gór Sowich
- IUCN category V (protected landscape/seascape)
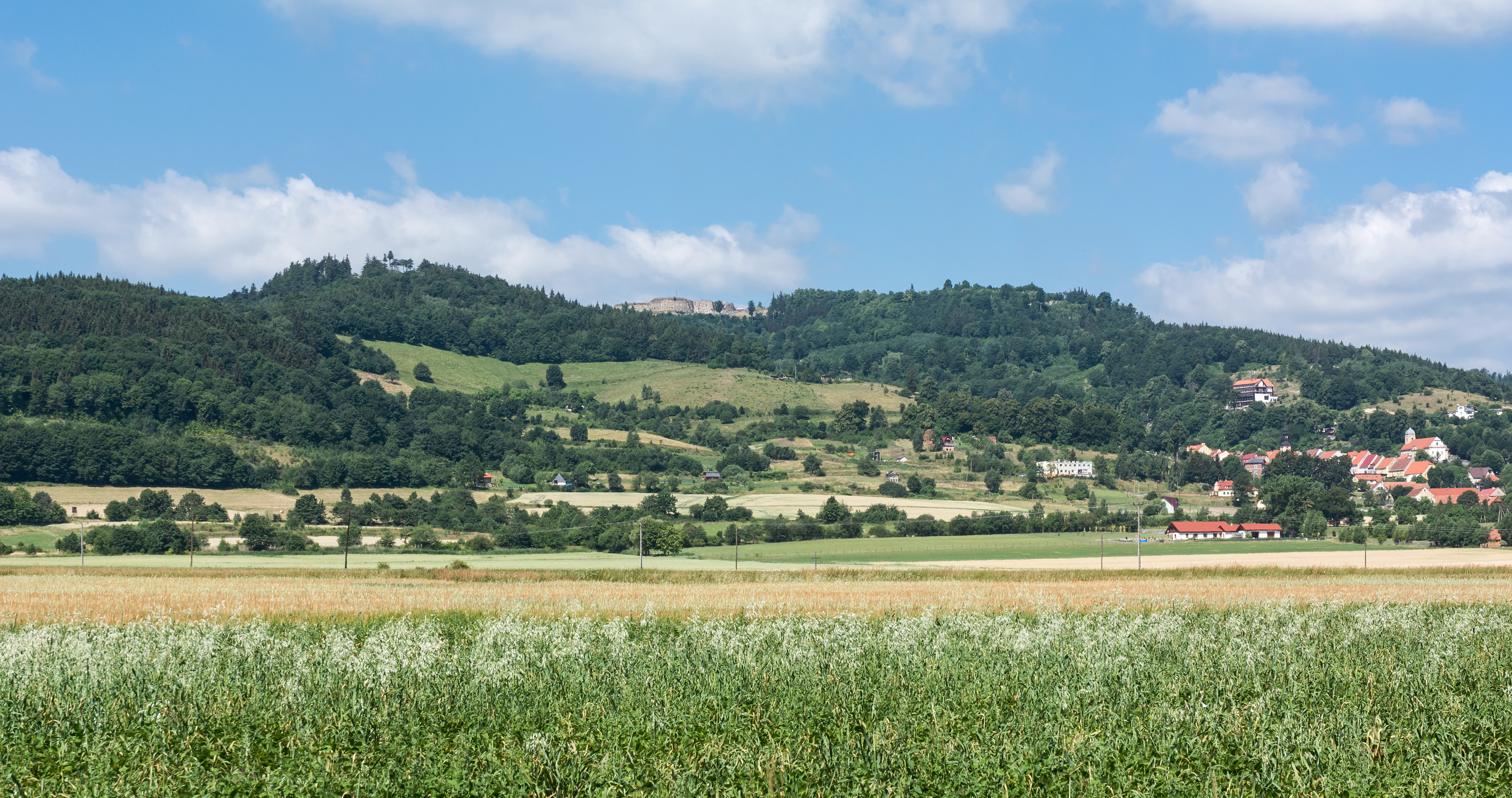
- Interactive map of Owl Mountains Landscape Park
- Location: Lower Silesian Voivodeship
- Coordinates: 50°40′45″N 16°29′13″E
- Area: 81.41 km^{2} (31.43 sq mi)
- Established: 1991
- Website: Park Krajobrazowy Gór Sowich (in Polish)

Owl Mountains Landscape Park (Park Krajobrazowy Gór Sowich) is a protected area (Landscape Park) in the Owl Mountains in south-western Poland, established in 1991, covering an area of 81.41 square kilometres (31.43 sq mi).

The Park lies within Lower Silesian Voivodeship: in Dzierżoniów County (Gmina Dzierżoniów), Kłodzko County (Gmina Nowa Ruda), Wałbrzych County (Gmina Głuszyca, Gmina Walim) and Ząbkowice County (Gmina Stoszowice).

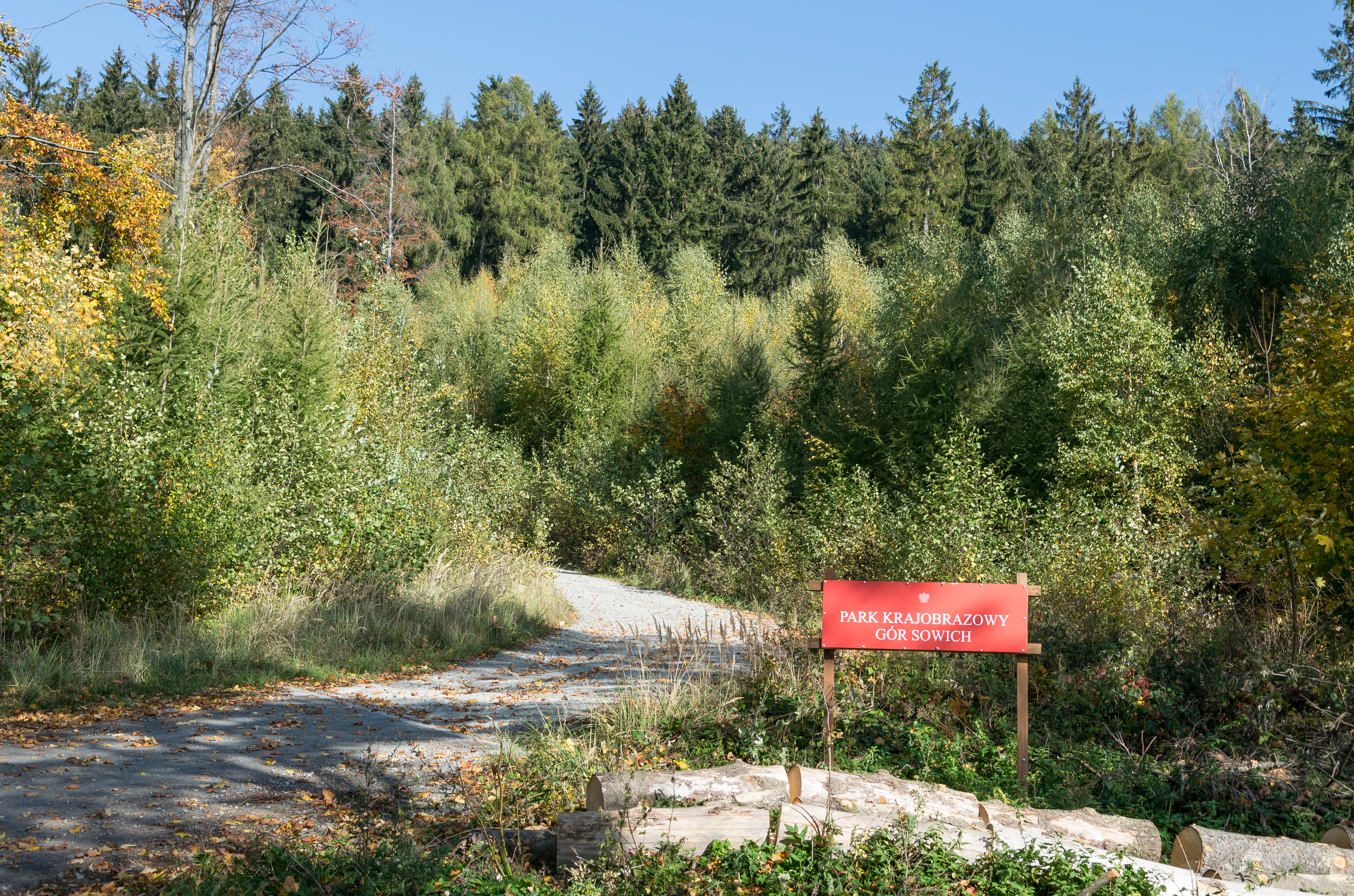
Entry point

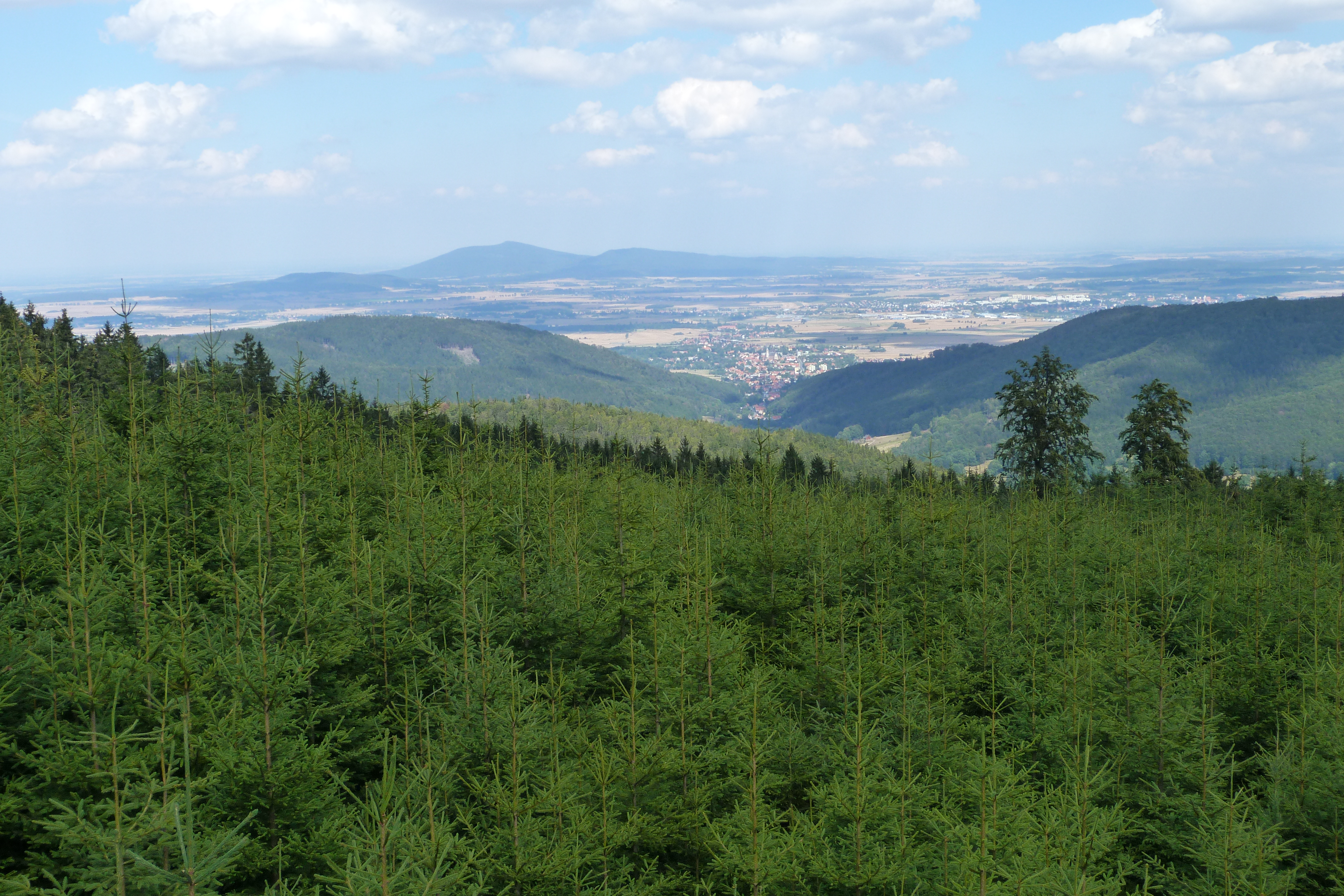
Summer

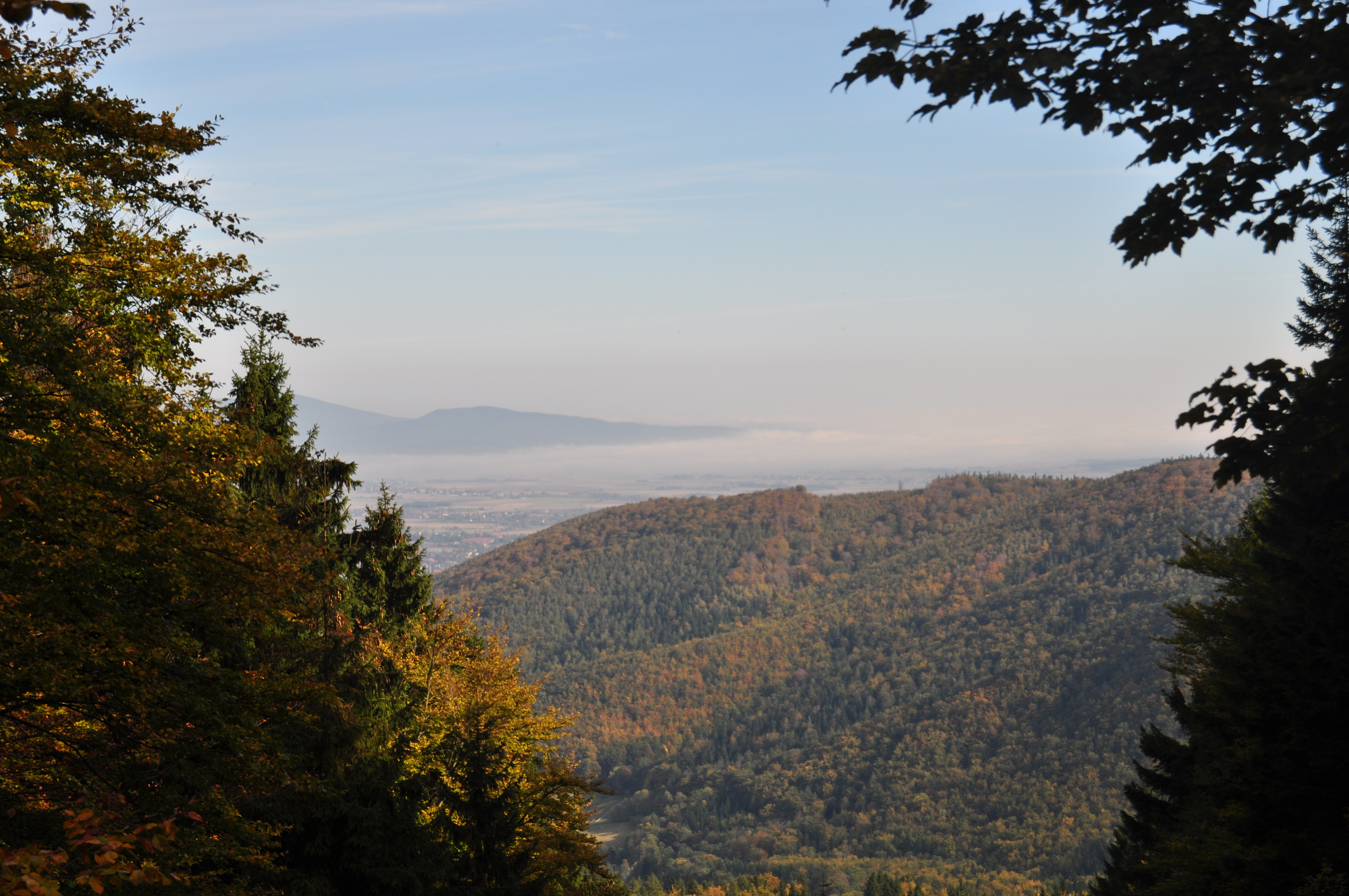
October

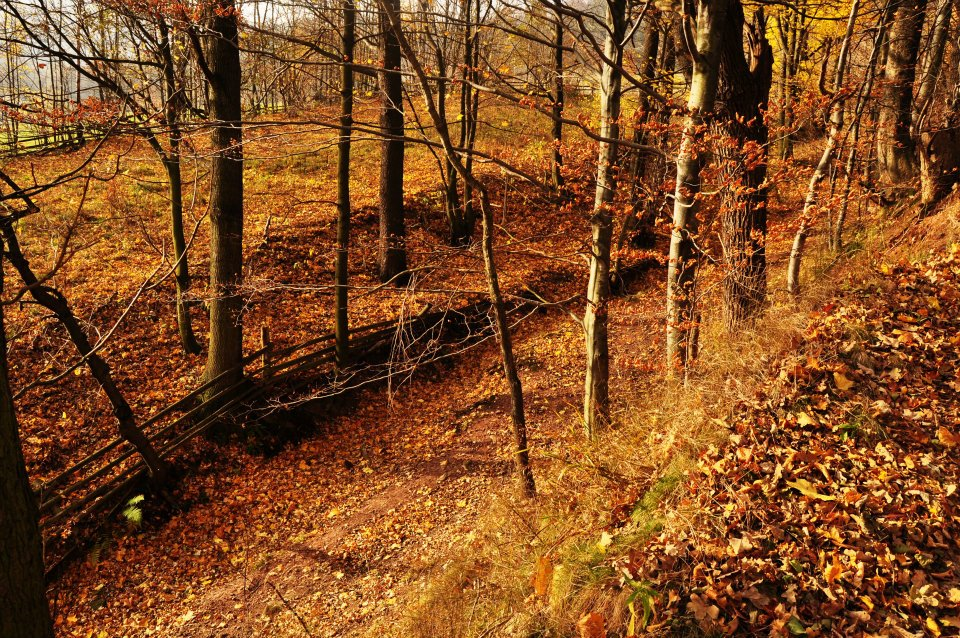
Autumn scene

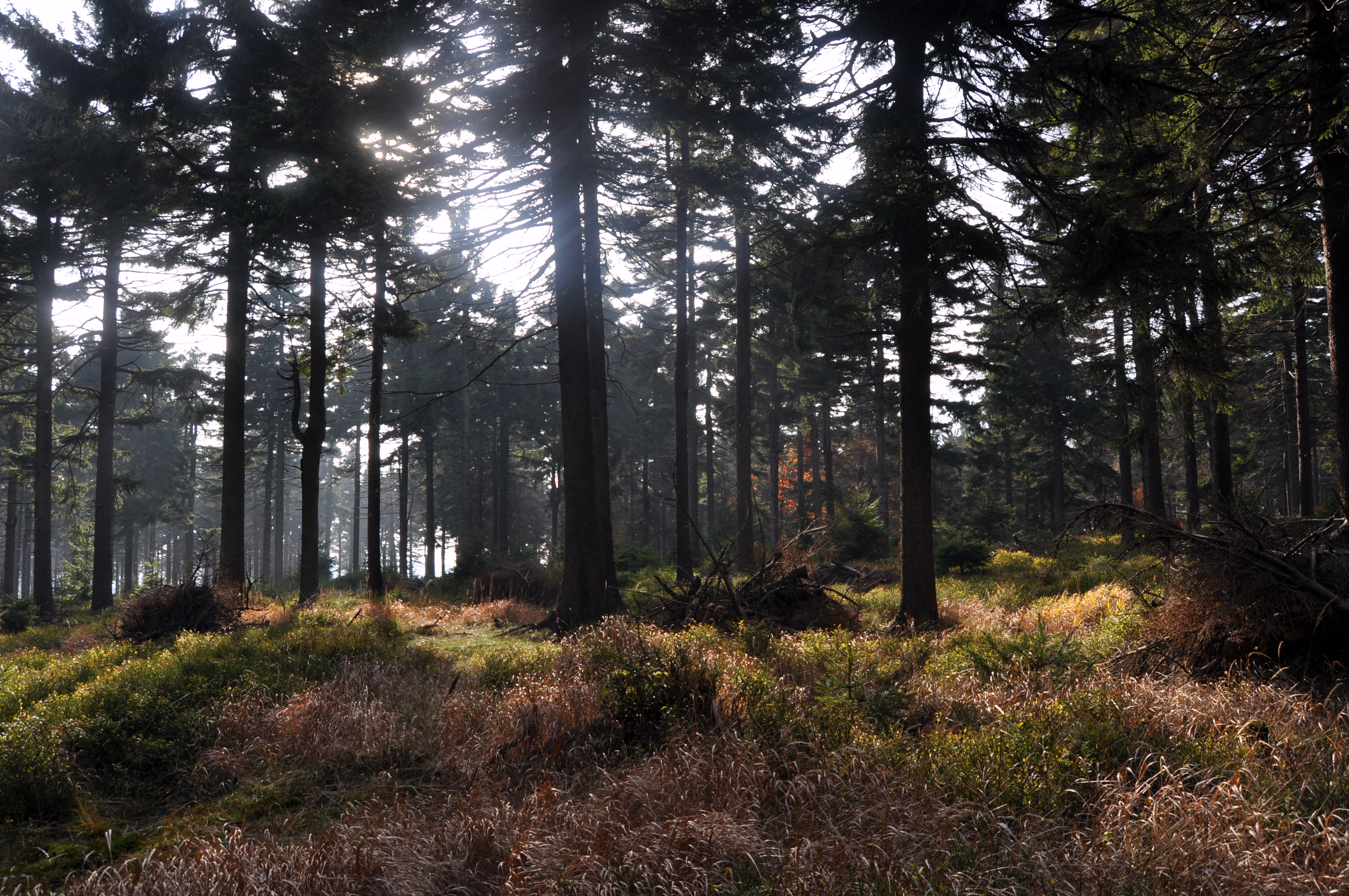
Conifer woods

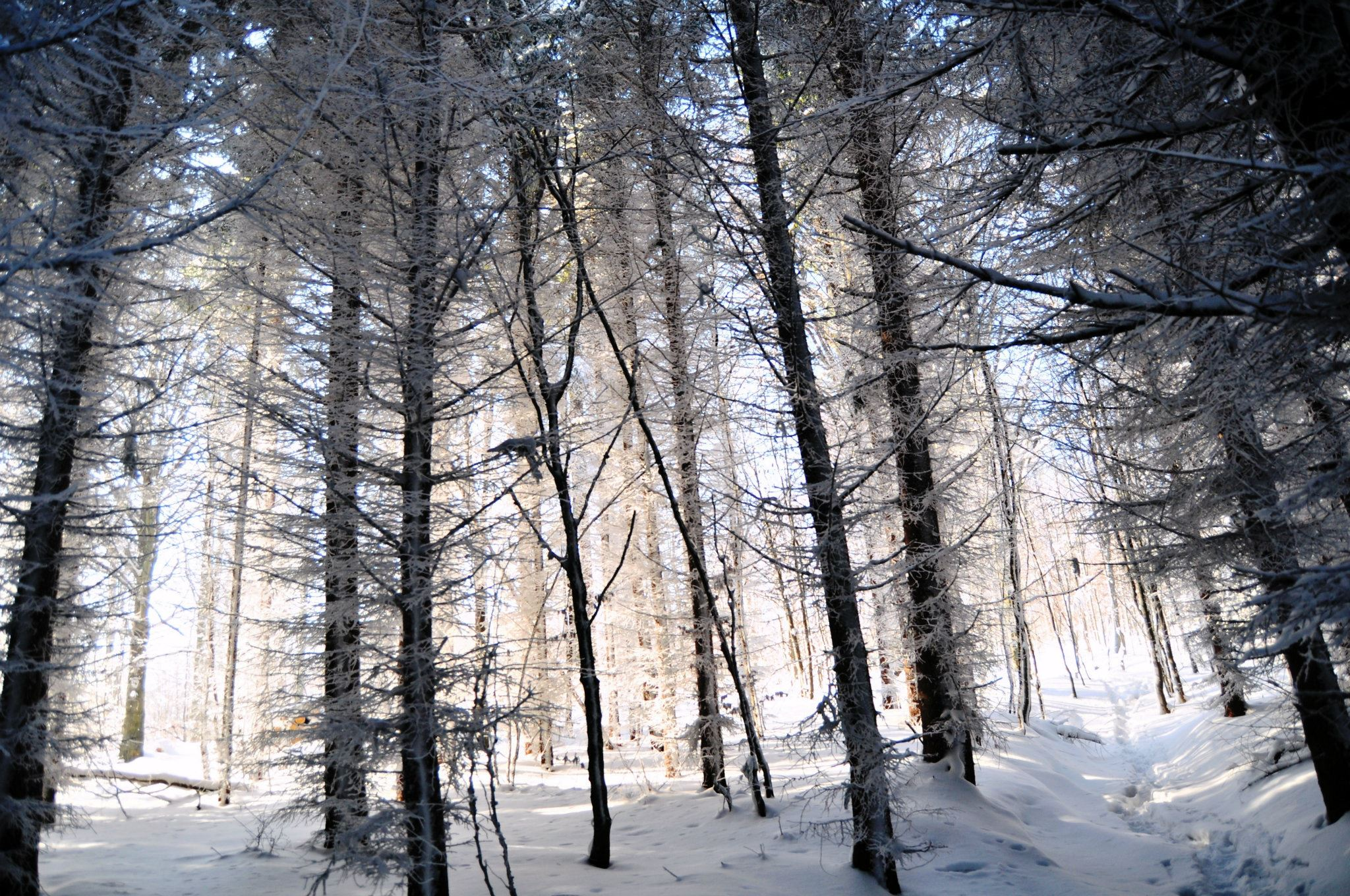
Winter scene

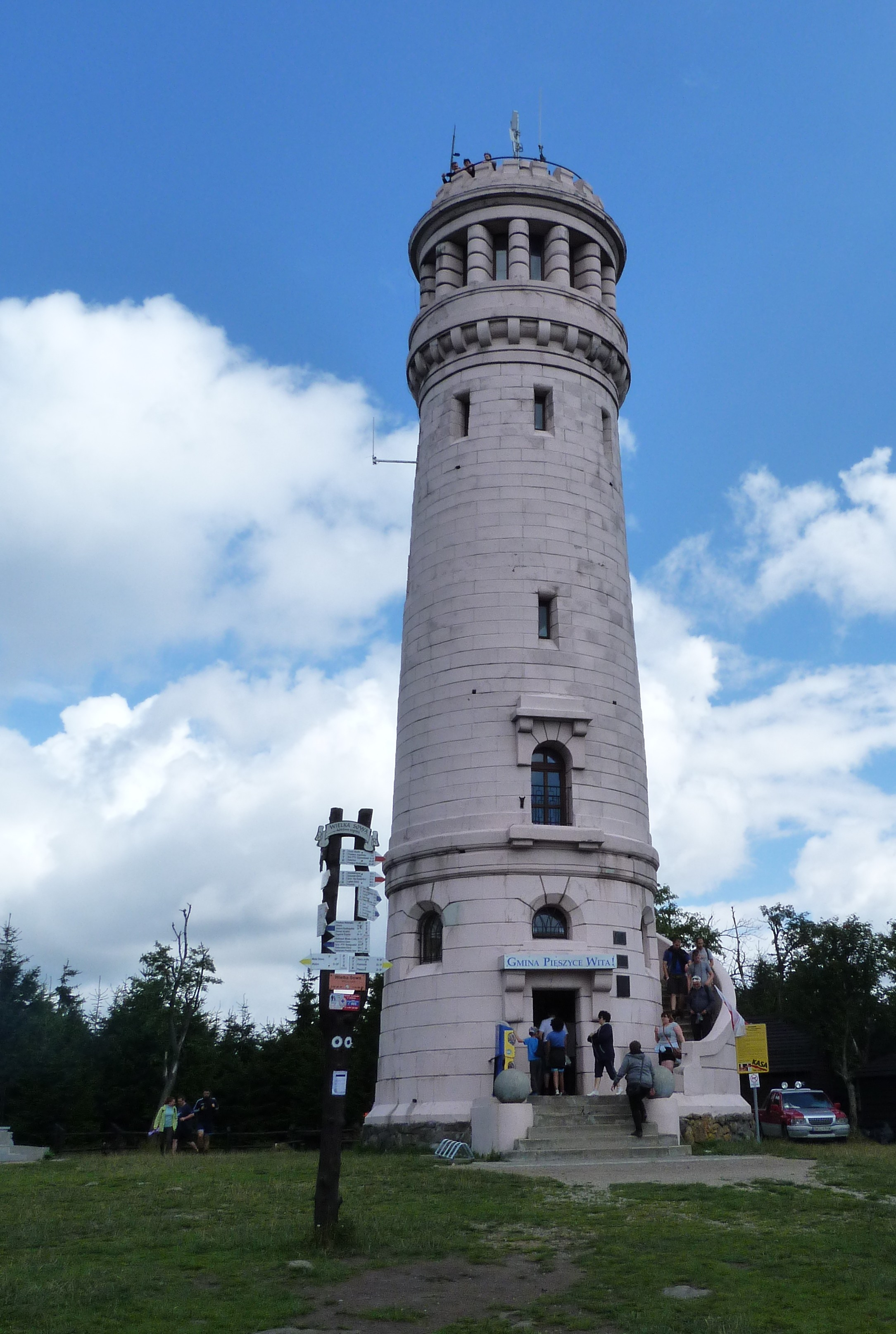
Wielka Sowa (Great Owl) lookout tower at 1015 m
