= Bardzkie Mountains =

Mountain range in Poland

Coordinates: 50.46667°N 16.75°E

- Polish: Góry Bardzkie; Czech: Bardské hory; German: Warthagebirge
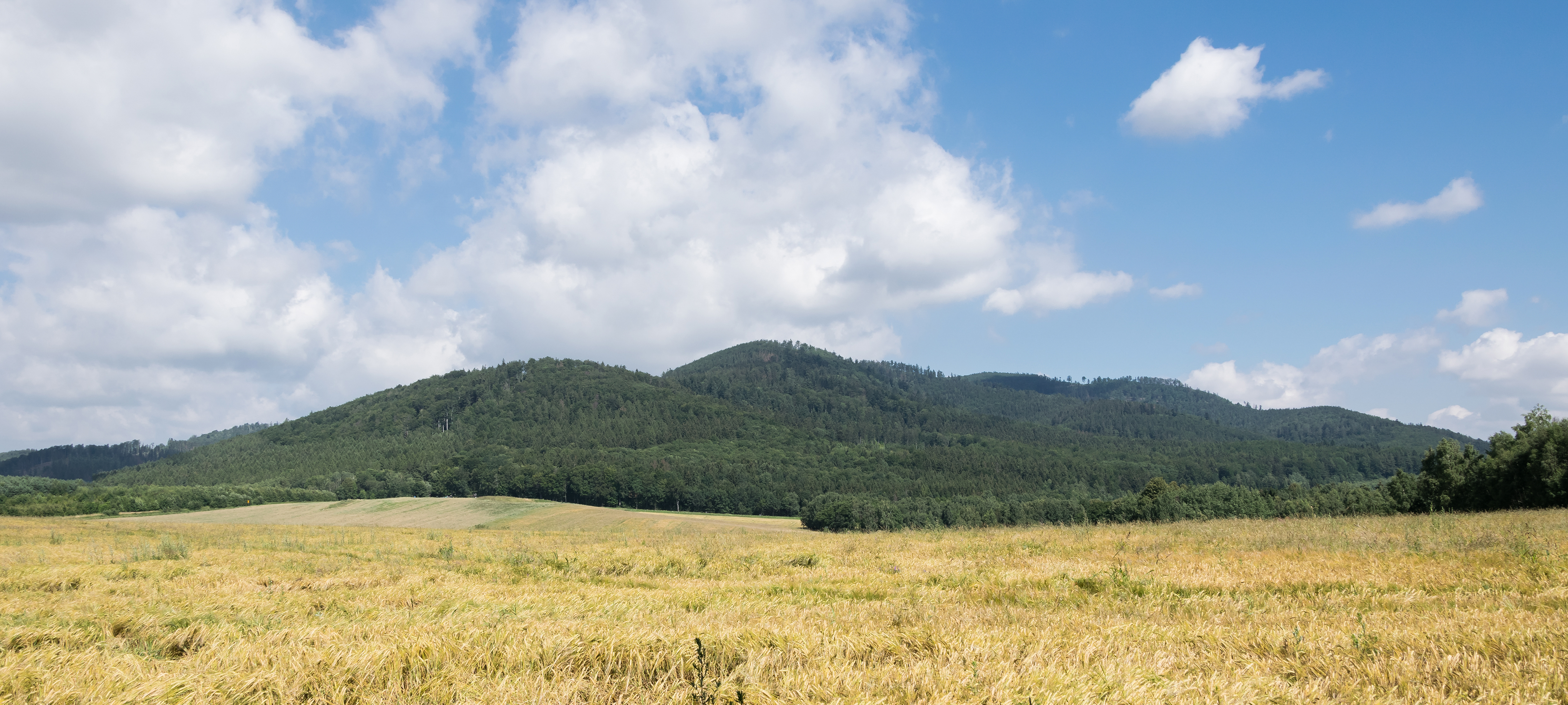
- Landscape in the Bardzkie Mountains

Highest point
- Peak: Szeroka Góra
- Elevation: 766 m (2,513 ft)

Naming
- Native name: Polish: Góry Bardzkie

Geography
- Location within Poland
- Country: Poland
- Voivodeship: Lower Silesian
- Parent range: Sudetes

The Bardzkie Mountains (Polish: Góry Bardzkie) are a mountain range in the Sudetes in south-western Poland. The official toponym is recorded in Poland’s national register of geographical names (PRNG).

The highest point is generally given as Szeroka Góra (about 766 m), while the neighbouring Wapniarka (757 m) is the best-known summit and features a 34.5 m observation tower (built in 2020).

== Geography ==
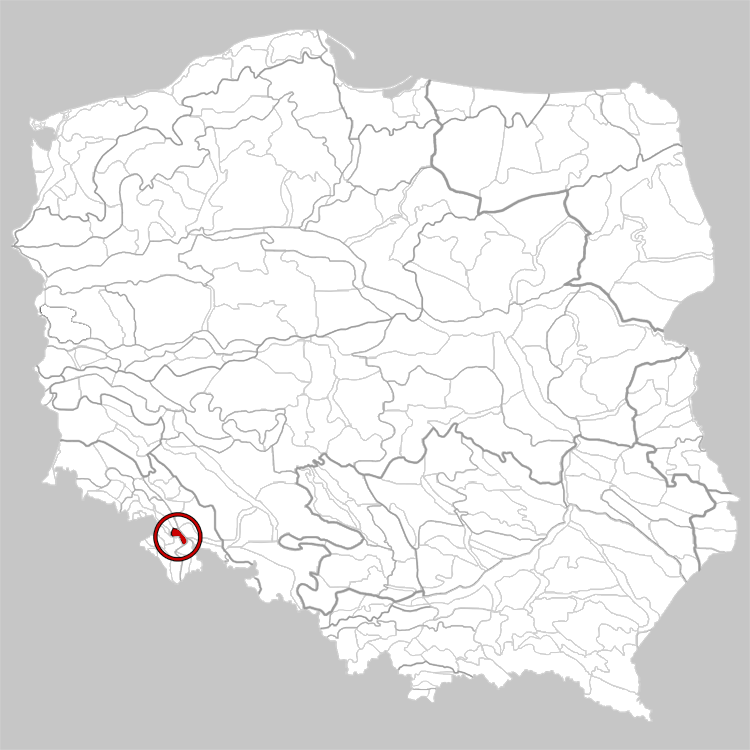
Location in Poland

The range is centred on the valley of the Nysa Kłodzka and is commonly associated with the scenic river gorge near the town of Bardo.

A standard reference work for the physical geography and toponymy of the Sudetes treats the Bardzkie Mountains as a distinct unit within the Central Sudetes.

== Nature protection ==
Parts of the range are included in the EU Natura 2000 network as the special area of conservation Góry Bardzkie (PLH020062). The site is designated in Polish law by a regulation of the Minister of Climate and Environment published in the official Journal of Laws (Dziennik Ustaw).

Protected areas and forms of nature protection within state forests managed locally are listed by the State Forests District (Nadleśnictwo Bardo Śląskie).

== Major towns ==
- Bardo
- Ząbkowice Śląskie
- Kamieniec Ząbkowicki
- Srebrna Góra
- Kłodzko
