= Błędne Skały =

Rock formation in Poland

Coordinates: 50°28′42″N 16°17′25″E

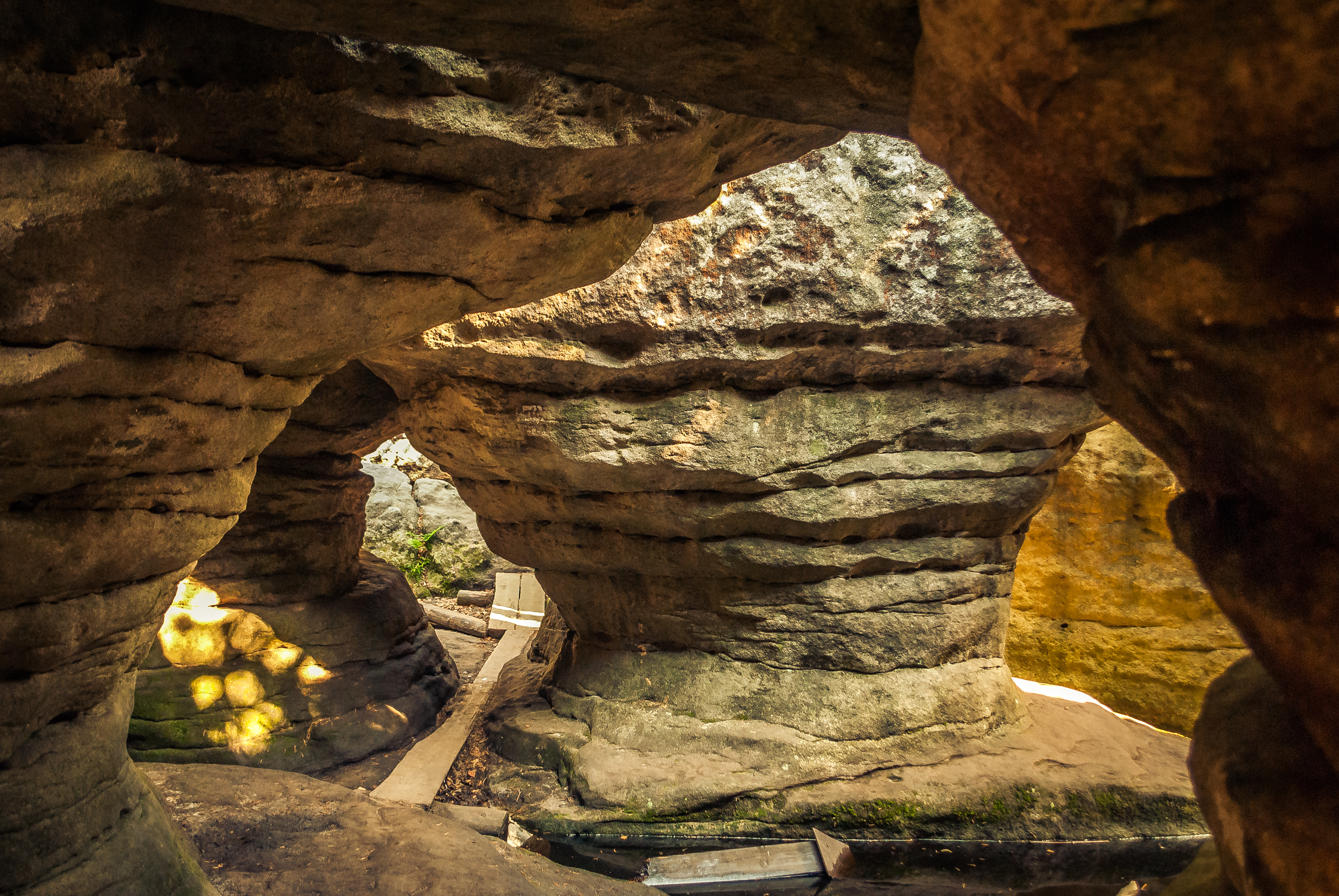
Corridors

Błędne Skały (German: Wilde Löcher) – a rock formation at an altitude of 853 m above sea level, forming a picturesque labyrinth (rock city), located in south-western Poland in the Central Sudetes in the Table Mountains.

== Location ==
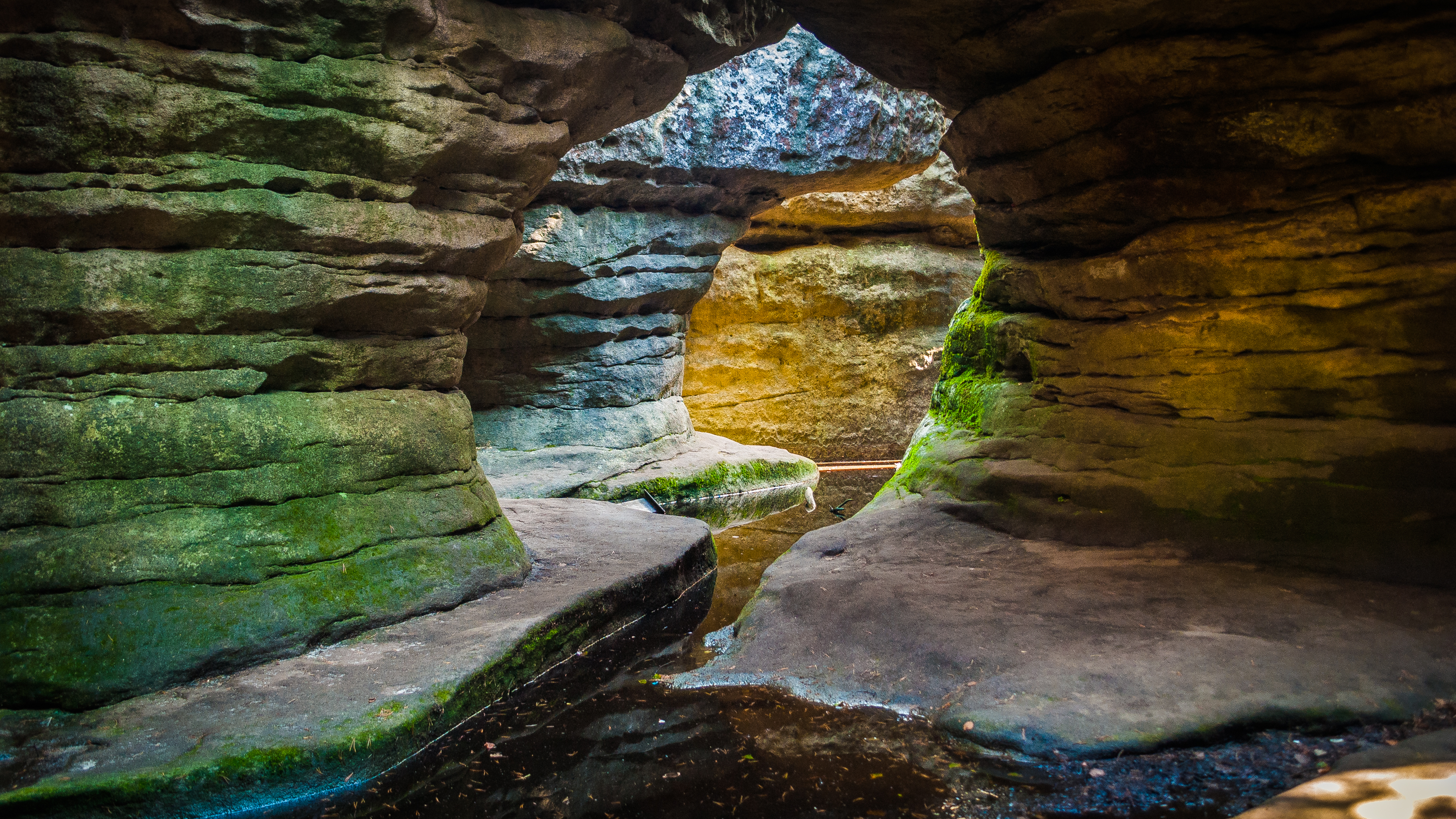
Corridors

The labyrinth is located in the Table Mountains National Park and includes the north-western part of Stoliwa Skalniak. It is located between Kudowa-Zdrój and Karłów, near the border with the Czech Republic. The nearest town is Bukowina Kłodzka. The area of about 21 ha was a nature reserve until the establishment of the Table Mountains National Park.

== Creation ==
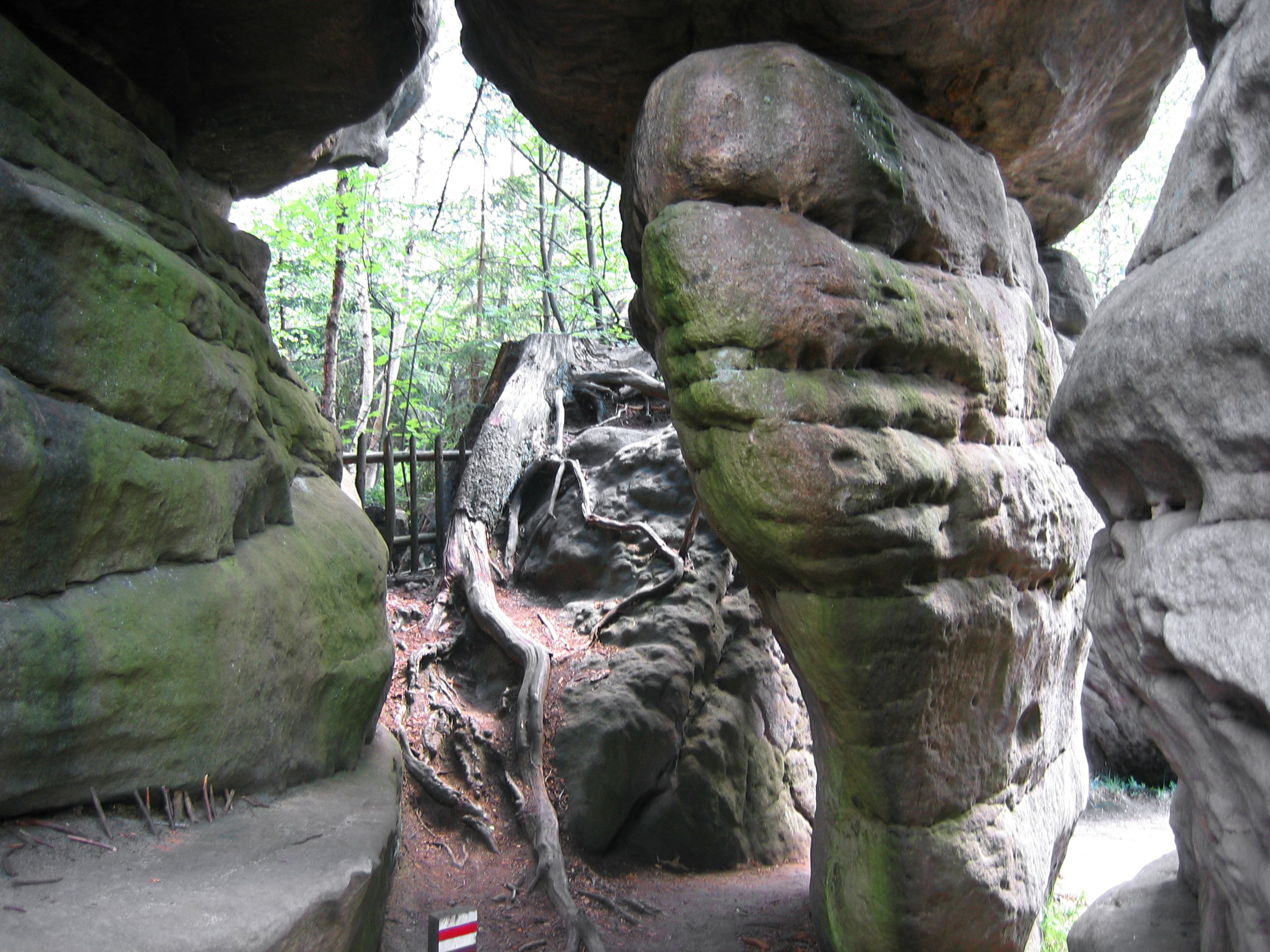
A rock called "The Ship"

At the bottom of the Upper Cretaceous sea, thick layers of sandstone were deposited. In the Tertiary, during the Alpine orogeny, they were lifted out along with the entire Sudetes. Then, a long period of erosion and the removal of weathering began. As a result of the uneven resistance of individual rock layers to weathering and the widening of fissures that cut through the massif in three directions, corridors of variable width, several meters deep, were created.

== Hiking trails ==
Two marked hiking trails lead through Błędne Skały:

- yellow tourist trail from Duszniki-Zdrój to Karłów
- green tourist trail from Polanica-Zdrój to Karłów,

There is a several-hundred-metre-long tourist route running between various rock formations such as rock maces, mushrooms, or pillars. Some of the rocks have their own names such as Stołowy Głaz, Tunel, Kuchnia or Kurza Stopka. In the narrowest places, tourists have to squeeze through rocky crevices several dozen centimetres narrow.

== Name ==
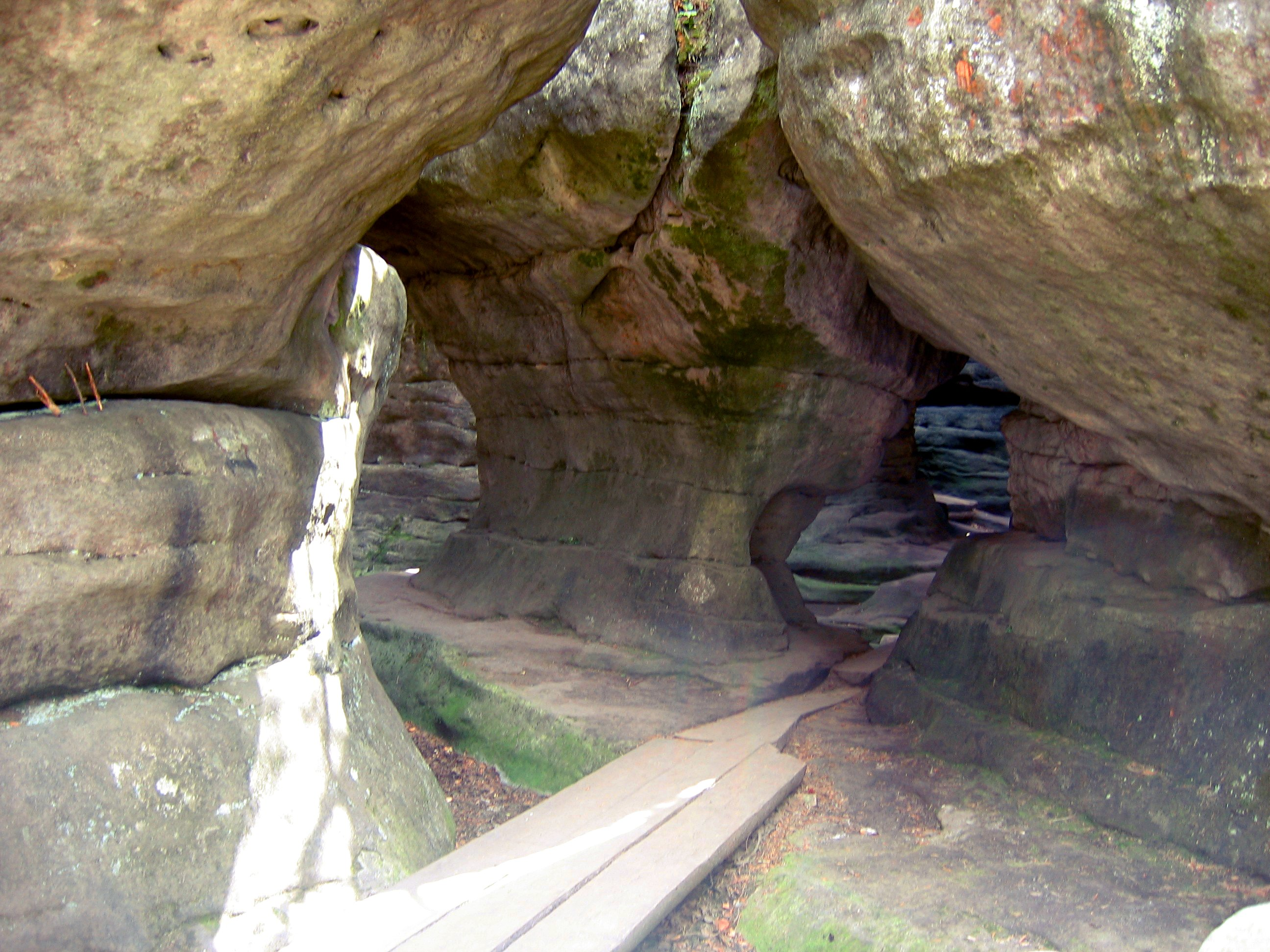
Corridors

For several years after World War II, Błędne Skały (Wandering Rocks in Polish) were most often referred to as the Wolf Pit. This term was used by soldiers of the Border Protection Troops in situation reports, journalists in press releases, and some authors of guidebooks, such as Anna and Ignacy Potocki. Sometimes Błędne Skały were compared to the ruins of a castle. According to legend, Błędne Skały were created by Rübezahl.

== Trivia ==
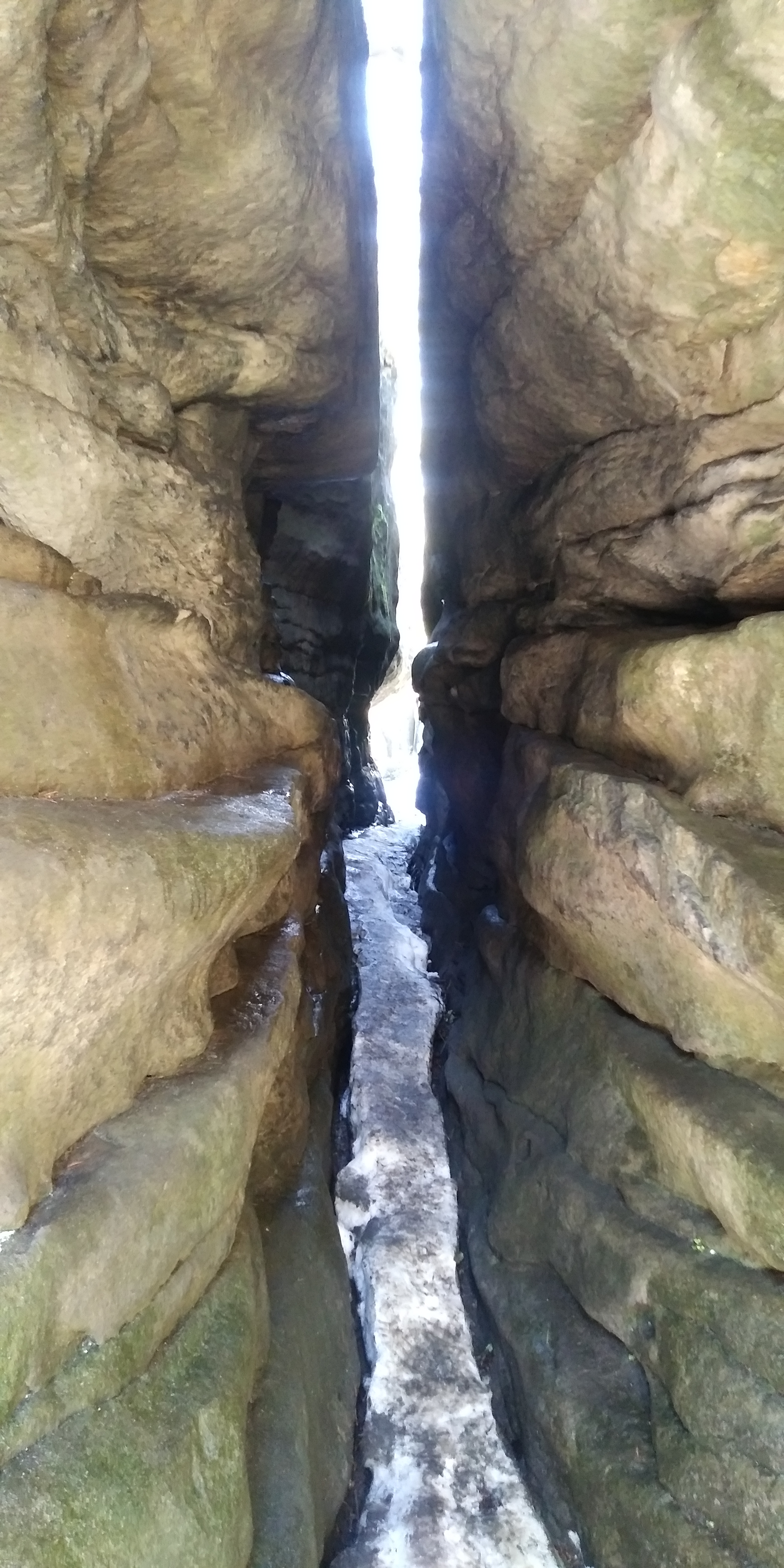
First day of spring

Błędne Skały were used as a setting for the following films: The Chronicles of Narnia: Prince Caspian, The Merry Devil's Friend, and Spellbinder.
