= Szczeliniec Wielki =

Highest peak of the Stołowe Mountains (Table Mountains) in Poland

- German: Große Heuscheuer; Polish: Szczeliniec Wielki; Czech: Velká Hejšovina
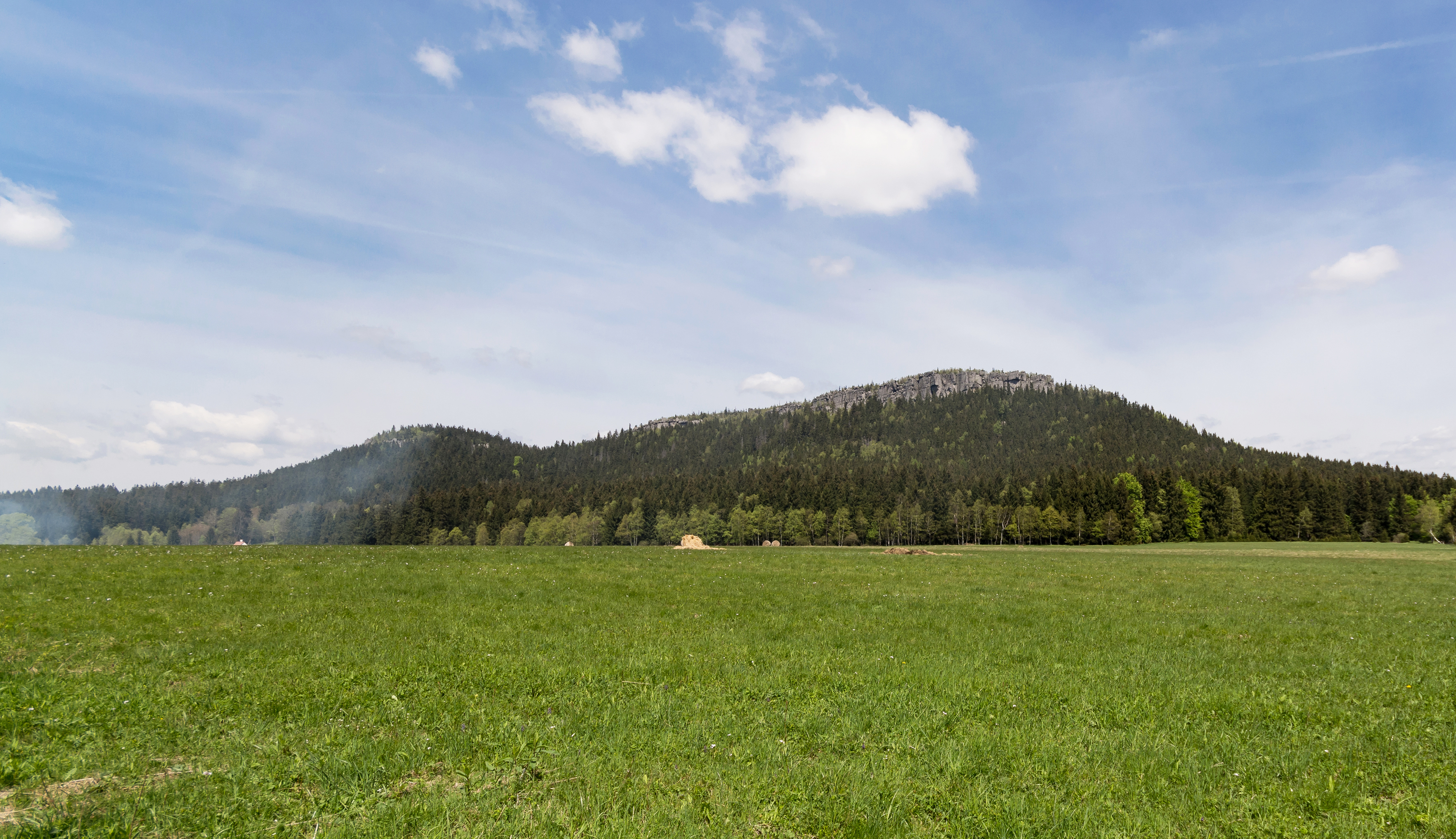
- View of the massif near Karłów (Szczeliniec Mały and Szczeliniec Wielki)

Highest point
- Elevation: 919 m (3,015 ft)
- Coordinates: 50°29′02″N 16°20′38″E

Geography
- Location within Poland
- Location: Lower Silesian Voivodeship, Poland
- Parent range: Stołowe Mountains (Table Mountains), Sudetes

Szczeliniec Wielki (German: Große Heuscheuer) is the highest peak of the Stołowe Mountains (Table Mountains) in south-western Poland, within the Stołowe Mountains National Park (Polish: Park Narodowy Gór Stołowych). It rises above the villages of Karłów and Pasterka, close to the Czech border, and is one of the best-known sandstone table mountains of the Sudetes.

The summit plateau is a sandstone massif dissected by fissures, corridors and rock labyrinths with named formations and viewing terraces. Depending on the reference, the height is also given as 922 m in some publications, while the national park’s tourist information commonly gives 919 m.

The highest point is a rock called Fotel Pradziada (“Armchair of Great Grandfather”).

== Name ==
The historic German name Große Heuscheuer refers to the mountain’s haystack/barn-like silhouette. The present Polish name is interpreted as “the great fissured/cleft mountain” (szczelina = fissure).

== Geology and landforms ==
Szczeliniec Wielki is built mainly of Upper Cretaceous sandstone, shaped by long-term weathering and erosion into isolated rock towers, narrow crevices and “rock city” passages. Parts of the plateau include deep, shaded fissures with a cold and humid microclimate; in some years snow patches can persist late into the season.

== Protection ==
The mountain lies inside Stołowe Mountains National Park, established in 1993 to protect the sandstone table-mountain landscapes and associated habitats. The park regulates access to the main tourist routes, including entry rules for the Szczeliniec Wielki circuit in peak periods.

== Tourism and access ==
Szczeliniec Wielki is most commonly reached from Karłów via a stone stairway (park materials describe around 680 stone steps) leading to the plateau. A marked one-way circuit route on the summit passes through rock labyrinths, narrow passages and viewpoints.

A mountain shelter, Schronisko PTTK „Na Szczelińcu”, stands on the plateau near the tourist circuit and is historically associated with the development of tourism in the Sudetes region.

== History ==
Tourism on the Große Heuscheuer is linked to late-18th-century travel in the Kłodzko/Glatz region. Franz (Franciszek) Pabel, a local guide from Karłów (then Karlsberg), is credited in historical accounts with opening and marking an ascent route around 1790 and is discussed in research on early guiding and tourism in the area.

An important German-language printed source for the region is Johann Friedrich Zöllner’s travel letters Briefe über Schlesien … und die Grafschaft Glatz (1793), available in digitised form via the Bayerische Staatsbibliothek.

Johann Wolfgang von Goethe visited the wider region in 1790 during his Silesian journey and recorded impressions in his diaries/notebooks; digitised editions include references to the Heuscheuer excursion context.

== Gallery ==
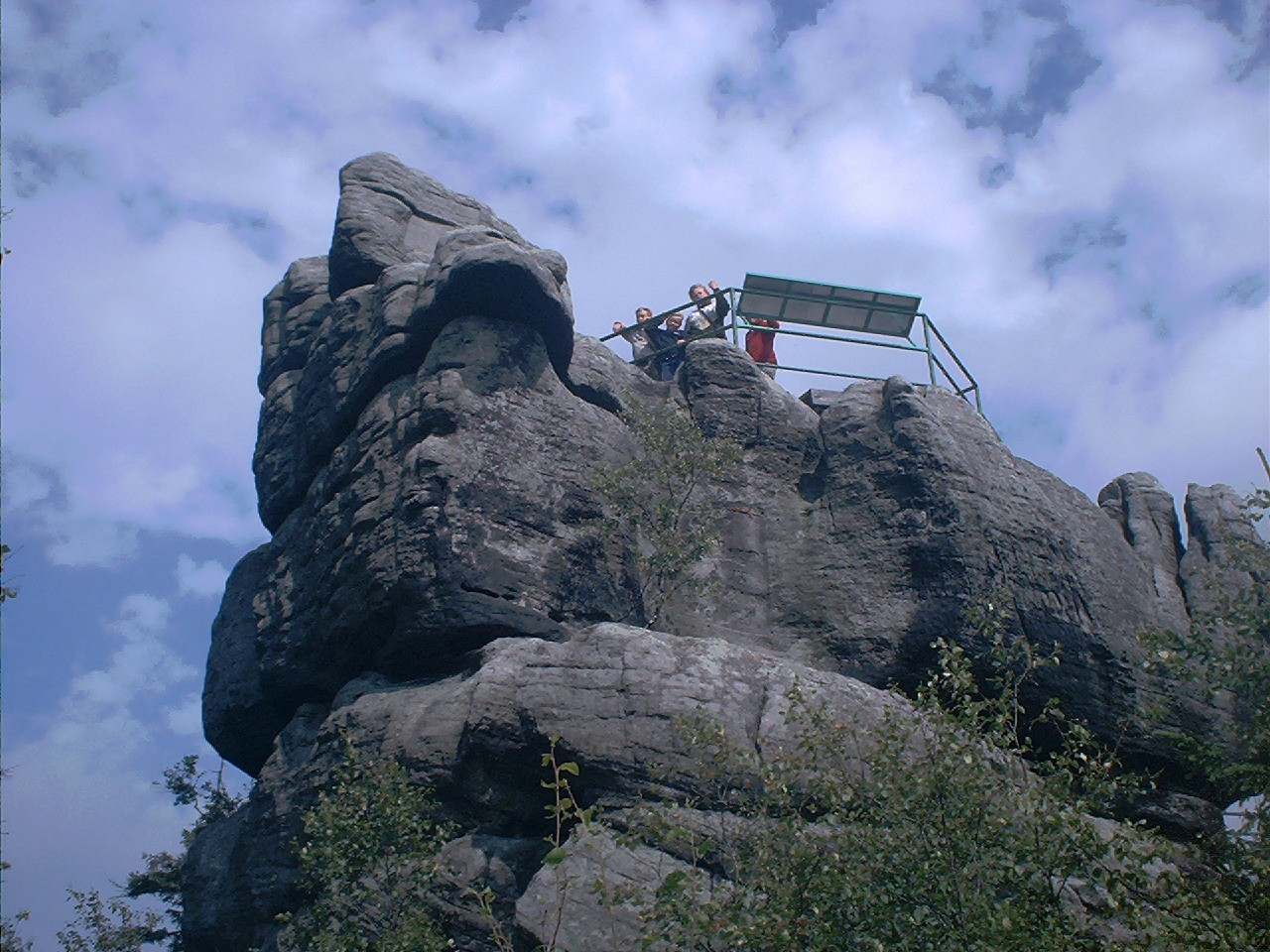
Fotel Pradziada (highest point)

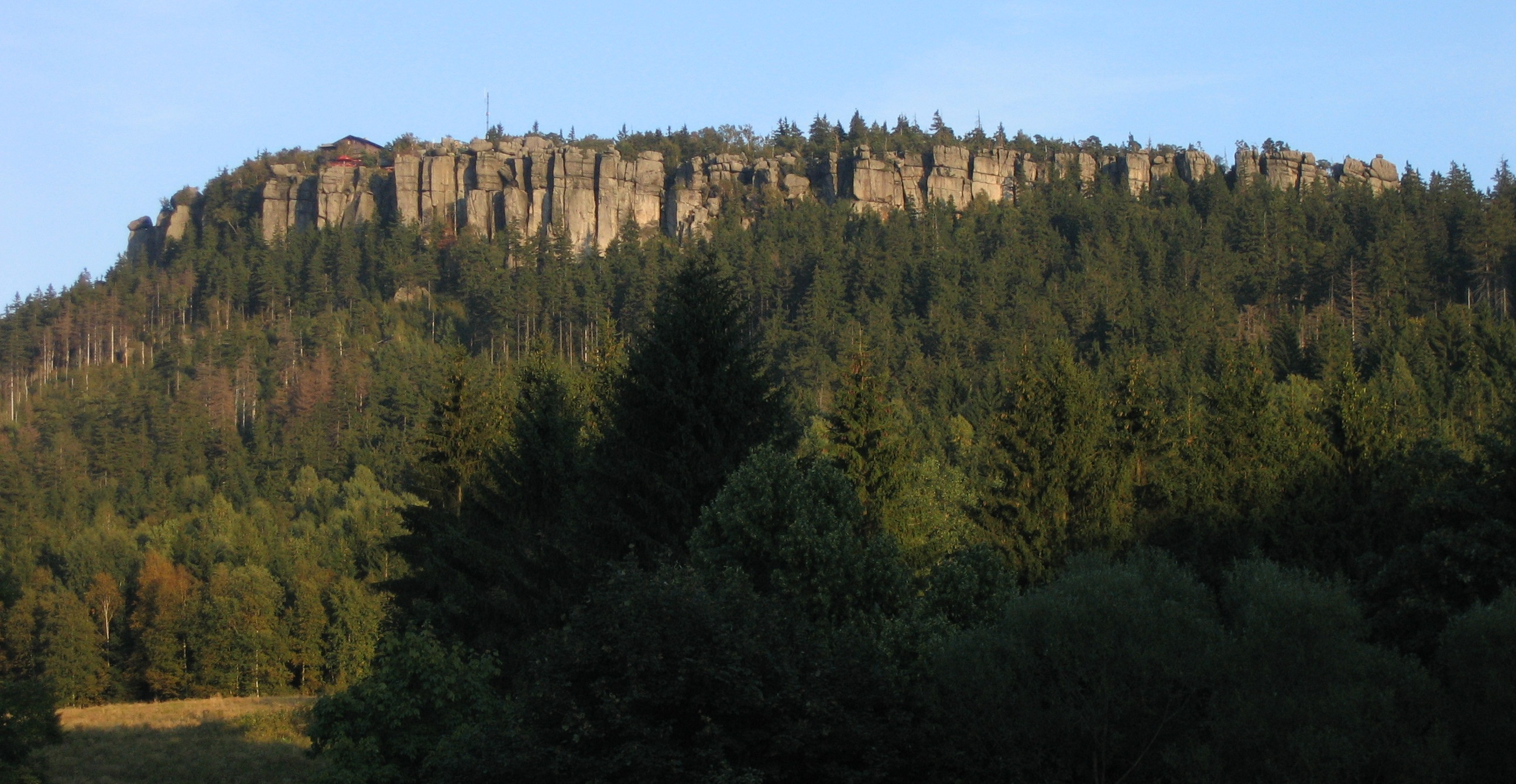
Sandstone formations on the plateau

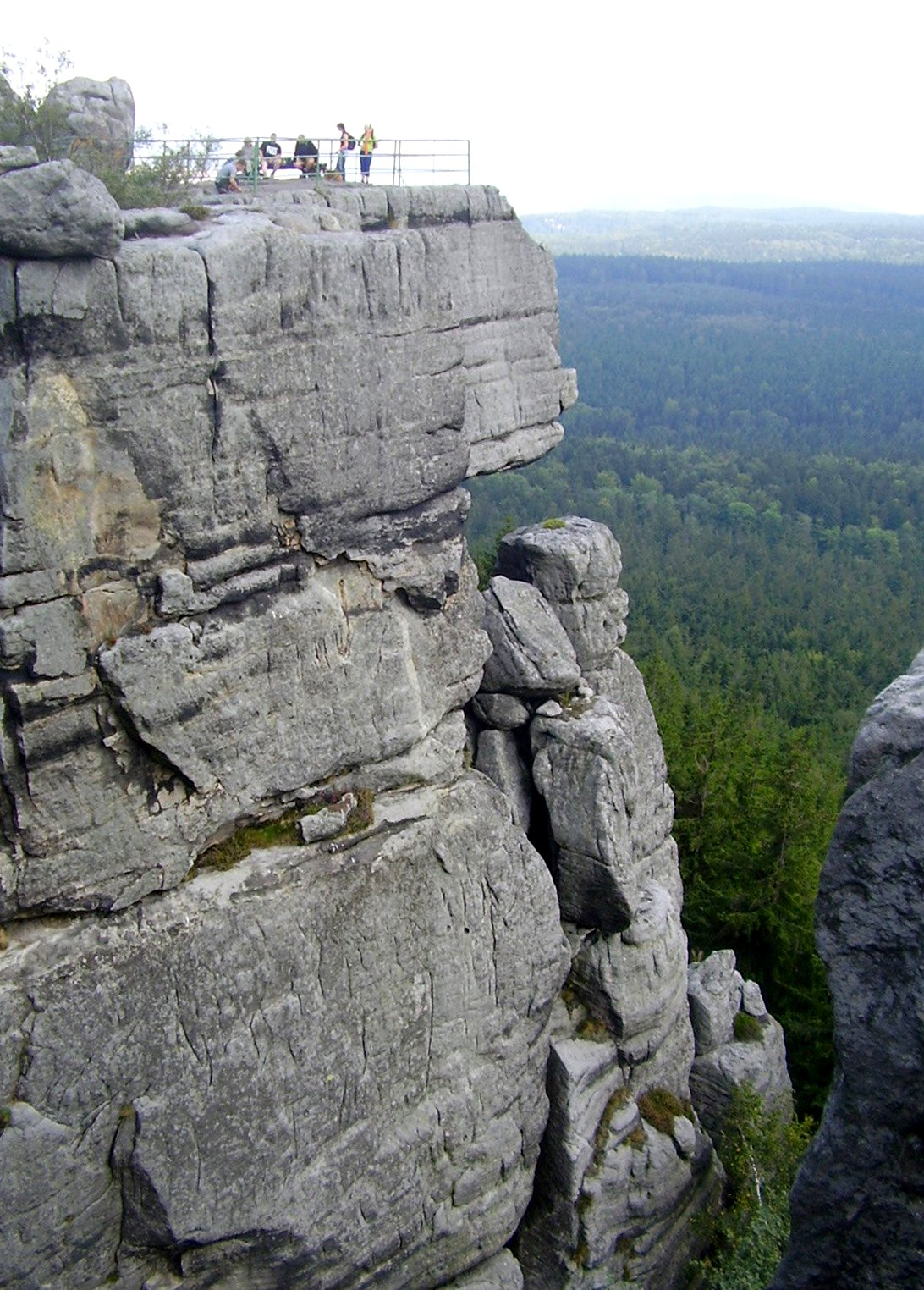
Viewing terraces
