= Stołowe Mountains =

Mountain range in Poland and the Czech Republic

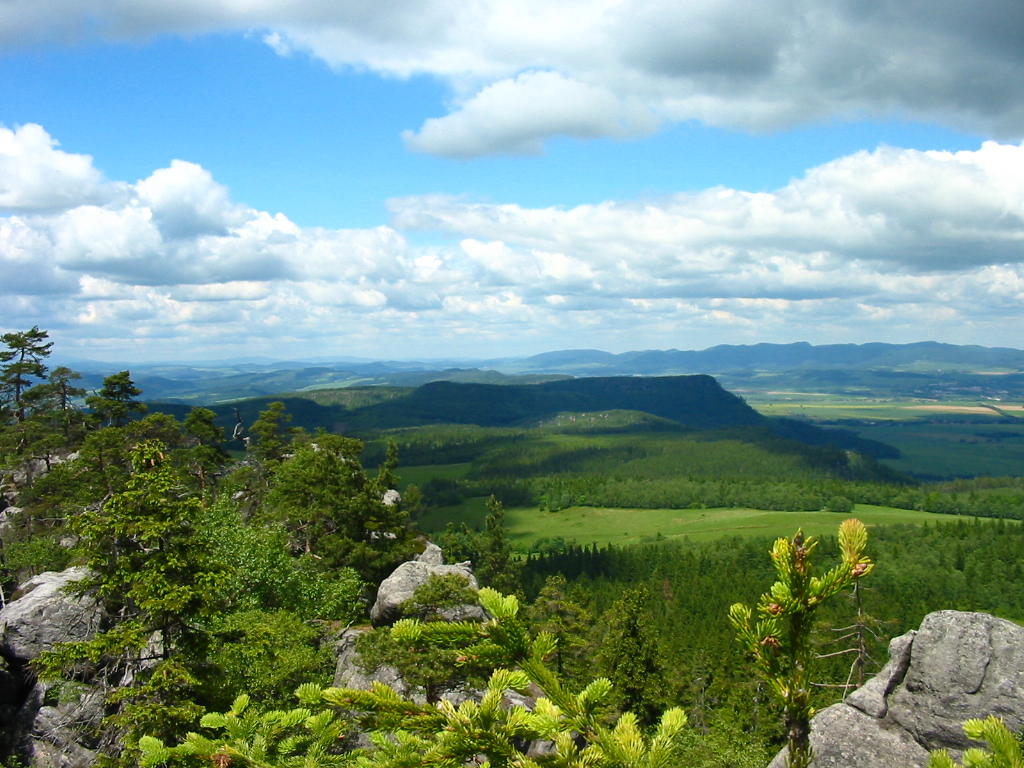
- View from Szczeliniec Wielki

Highest point
- Peak: Szczeliniec Wielki, Poland
- Elevation: 922 m (3,025 ft)

Dimensions
- Length: 42 km (26 mi)

Geography
- Location within Czech Republic
- Countries: Poland and Czech Republic
- Range coordinates: 50°28′00″N 16°20′00″E
- Parent range: Central Sudetes

Geology
- Rock type: sandstone

The Stołowe Mountains (Polish: [stɔˈwɔvɛ]; in English known as the Table Mountains, Polish: Góry Stołowe; Czech: Stolové hory) are a mountain range in Poland and the Czech Republic, part of the Central Sudetes. The Polish part of the range is protected as the Stołowe Mountains National Park. The highest peak of the range is Szczeliniec Wielki at 922 meters (3,025 ft) a.s.l.

== Geomorphology ==
The range is formed of sandstone and, as the only one in Poland, presents plated structure with sheer mountain ledges. Among the tourist attractions there are two massifs: Szczeliniec Wielki with a stone labyrinth on the top, and Skalniak with the Błędne Skały (Errant Rocks) stone labyrinth. There are several notable rock formations, among them Kwoka ("Hen"), Wielbłąd ("Camel"), Małpa ("Monkey"), Głowa Konia ("Horse Head"), and Fotel Pradziada ("Great Grandfather's Armchair").

== Film locations ==
Errant Rocks (Polish: Błędne Skały)

- The Chronicles of Narnia: Prince Caspian
- Spellbinder

== Gallery ==
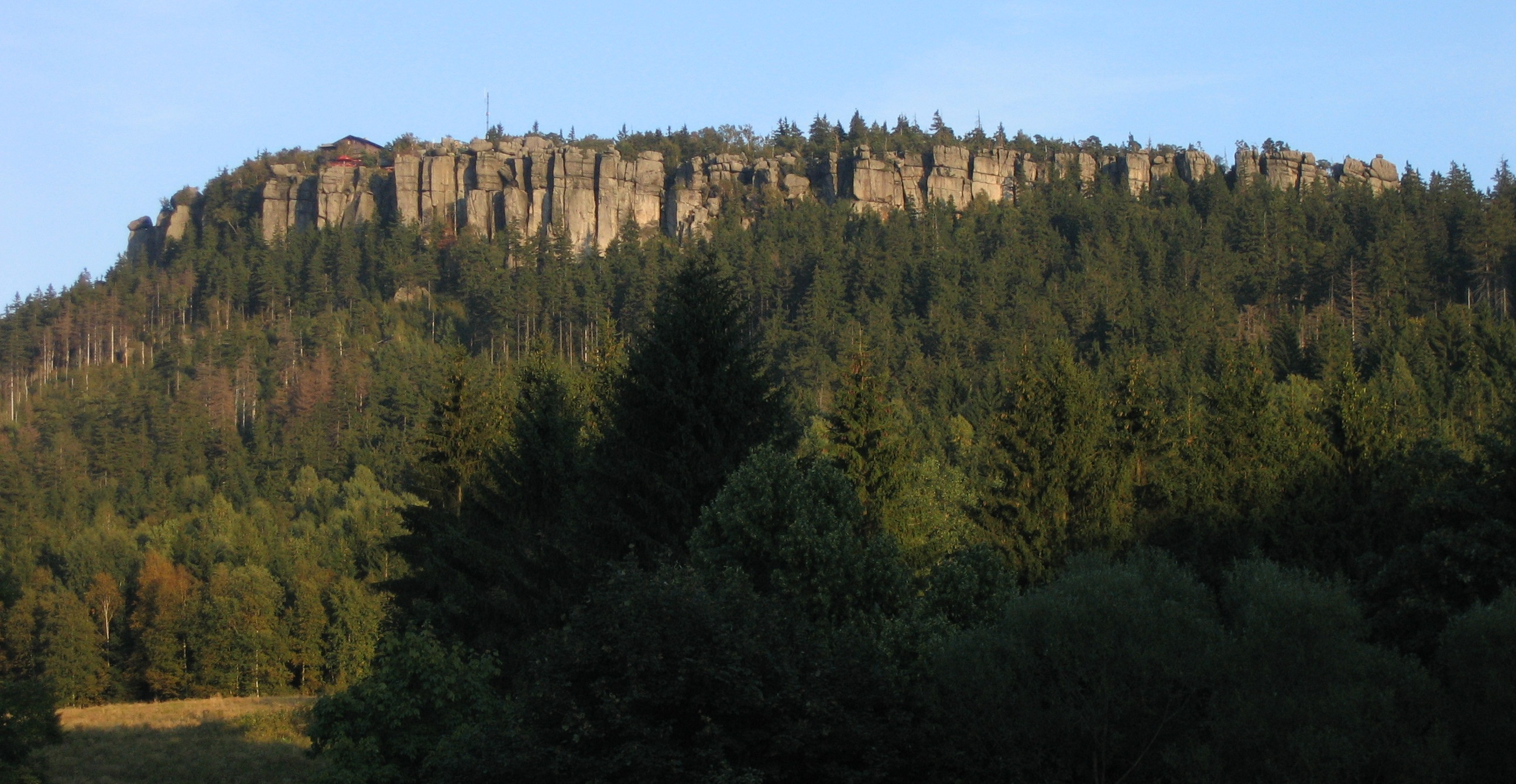
Szczeliniec Wielki seen from the Czech Republic

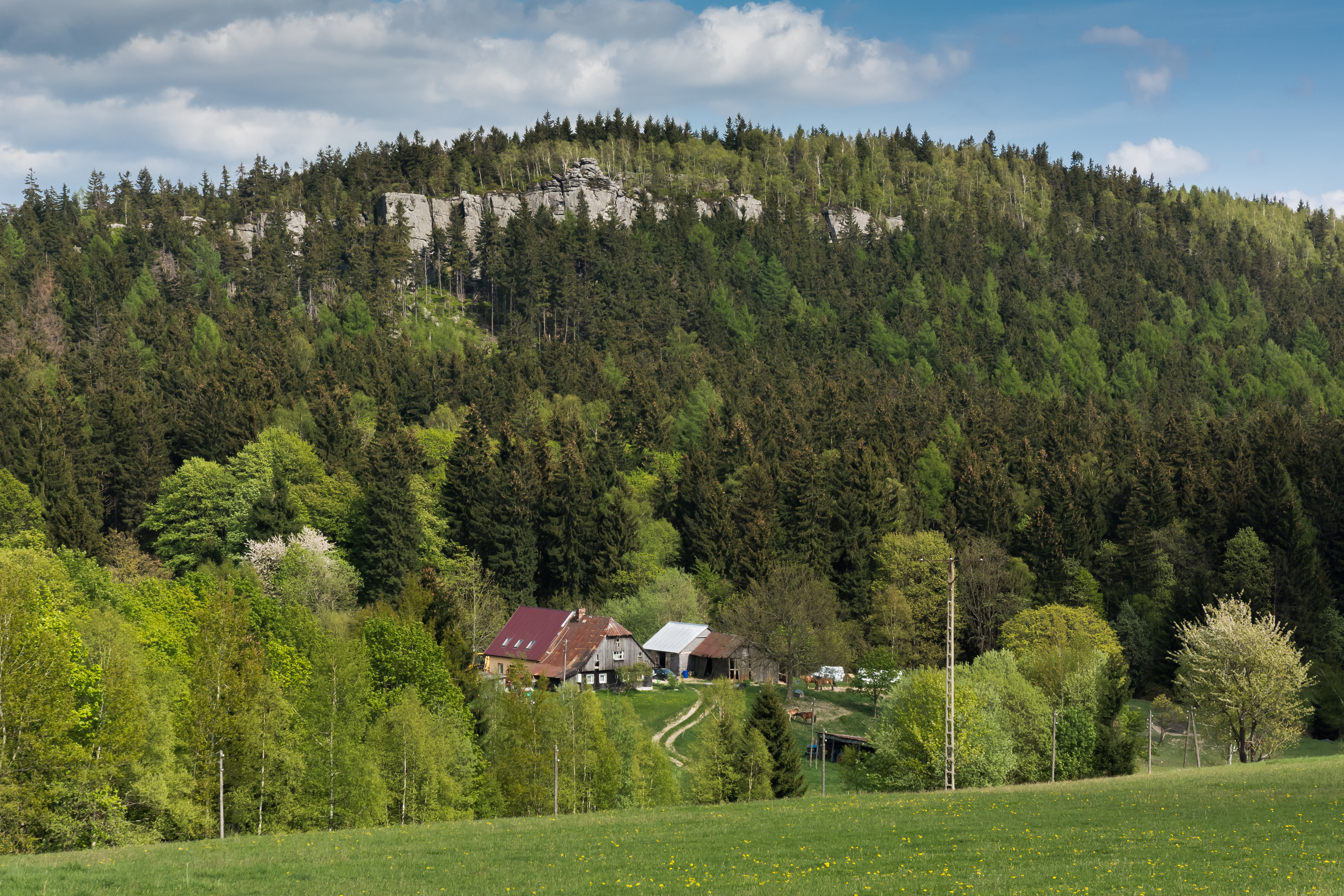
Kopa Śmierci

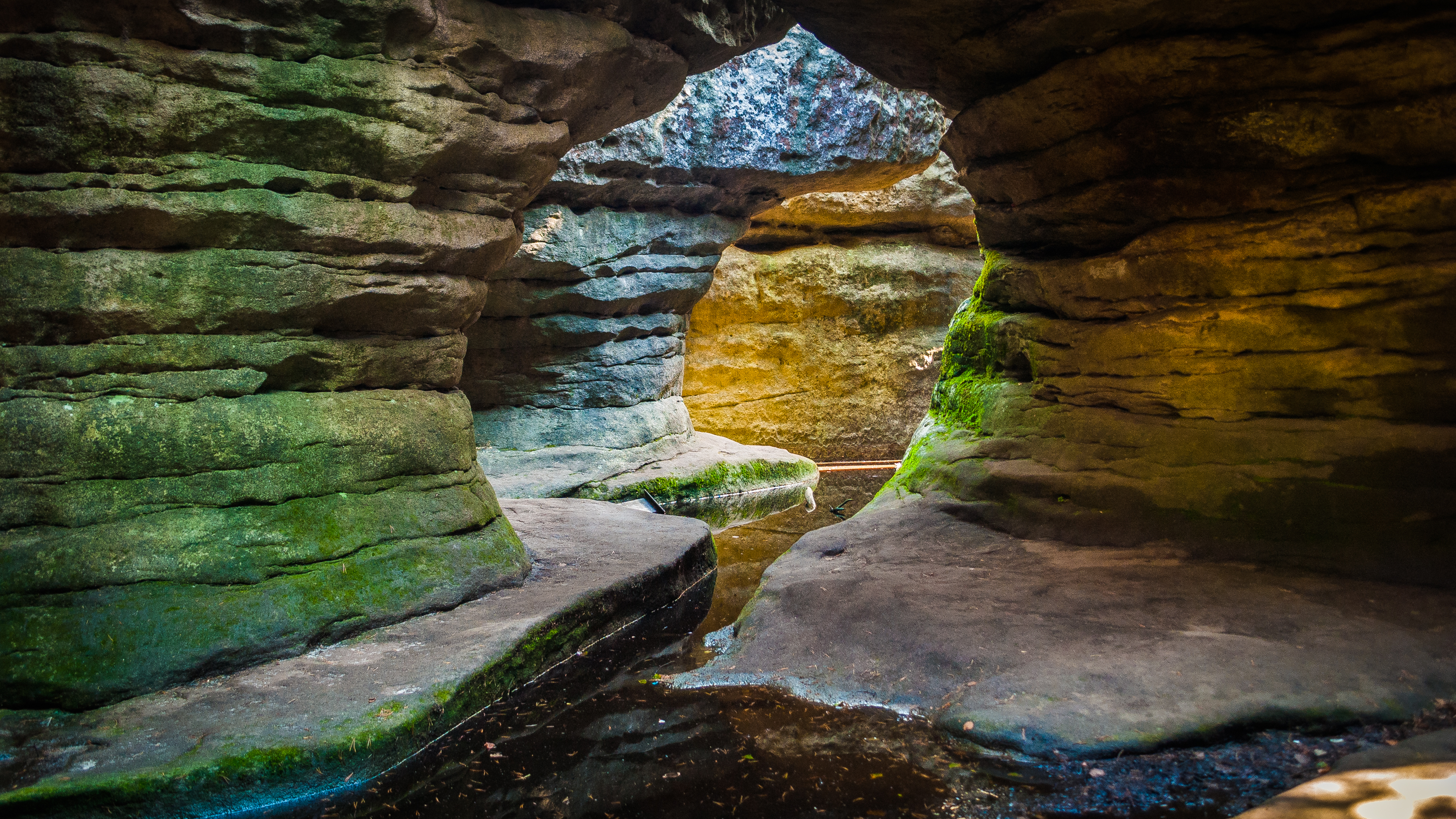
Errant Rocks (Polish: Błędne Skały)

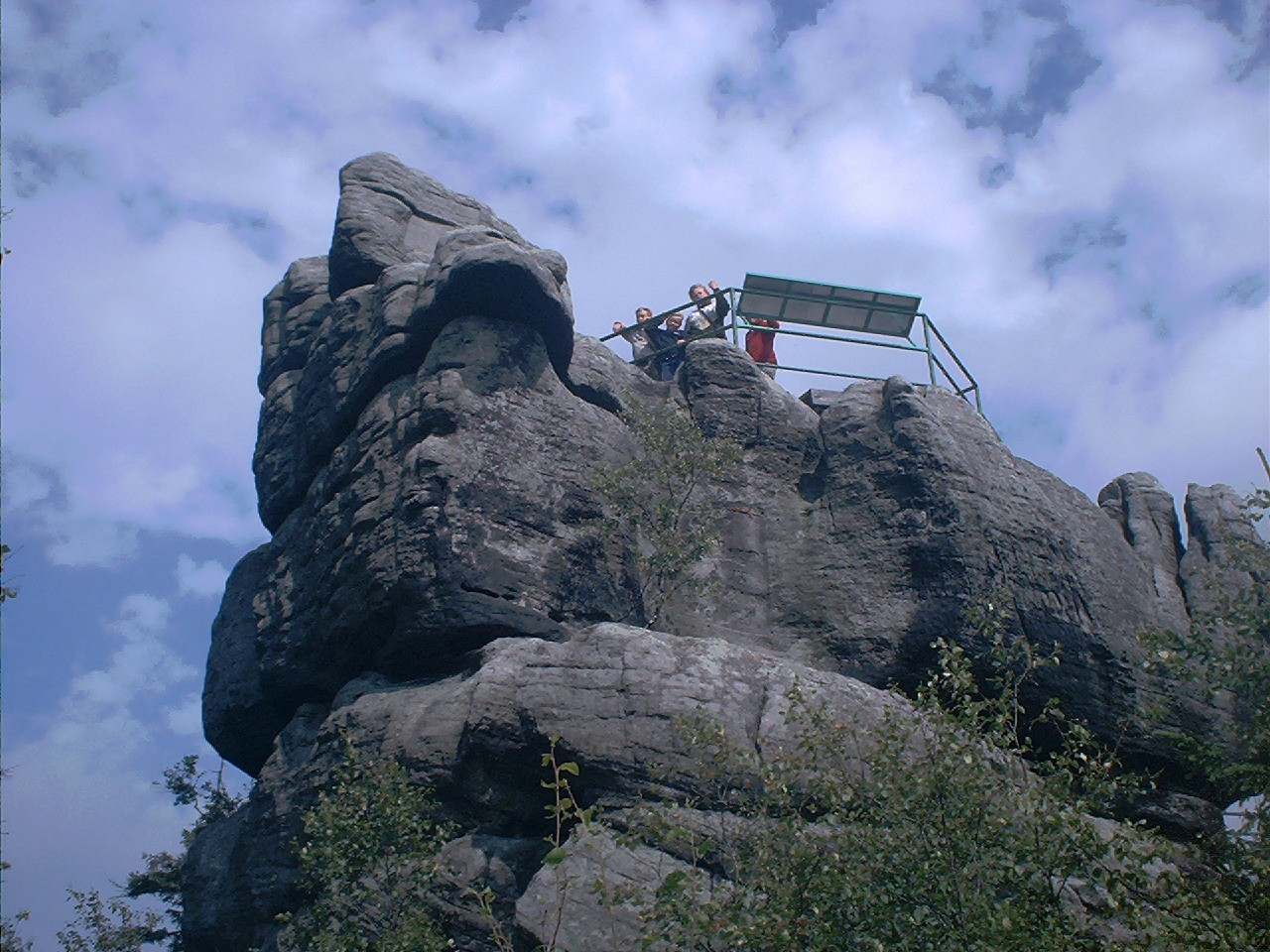
"Fotel Pradziada" on Szczeliniec Wielki

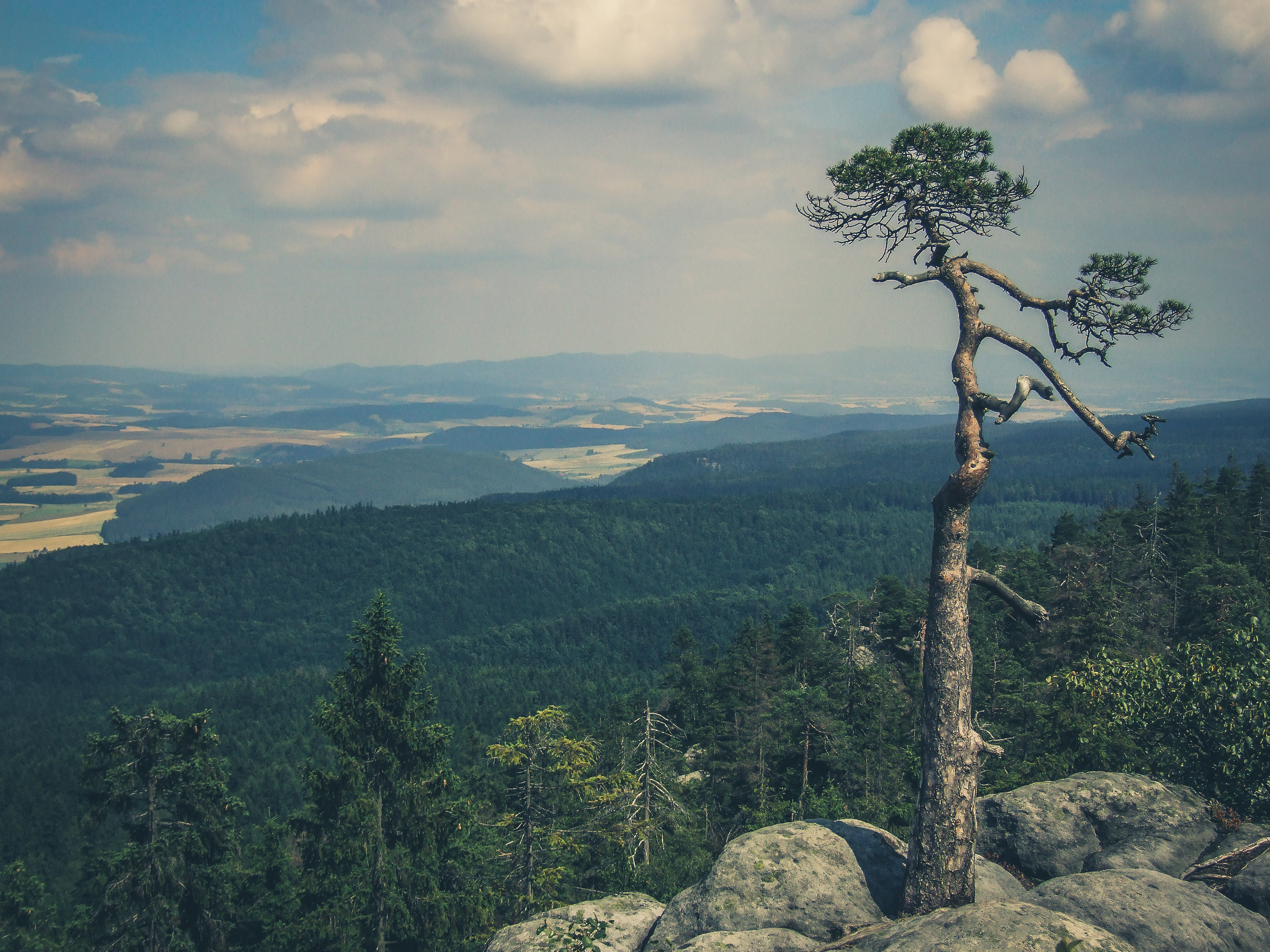
Panorama of the landscape seen from Stołwe Mountains

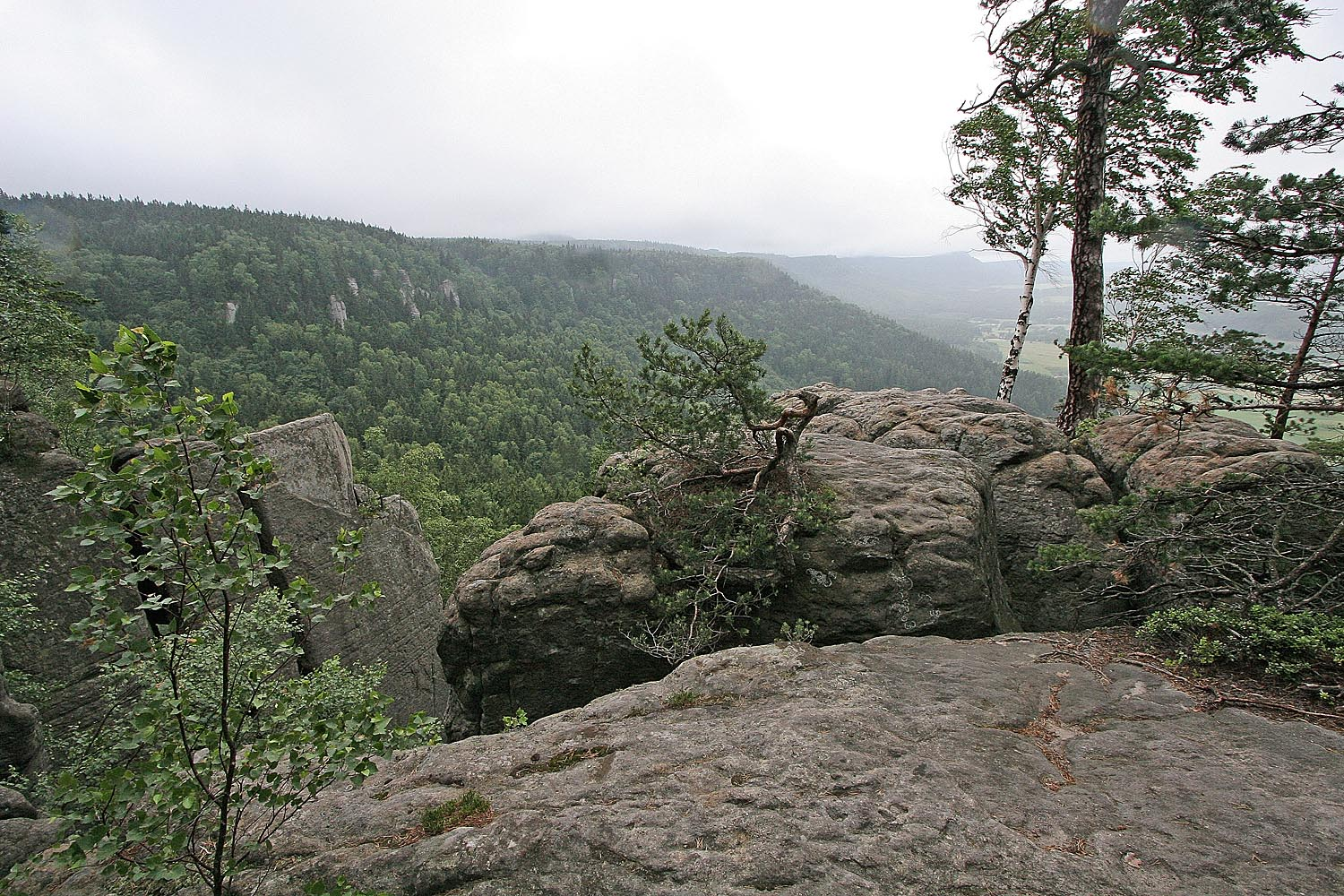
Radkowskie Skały formations

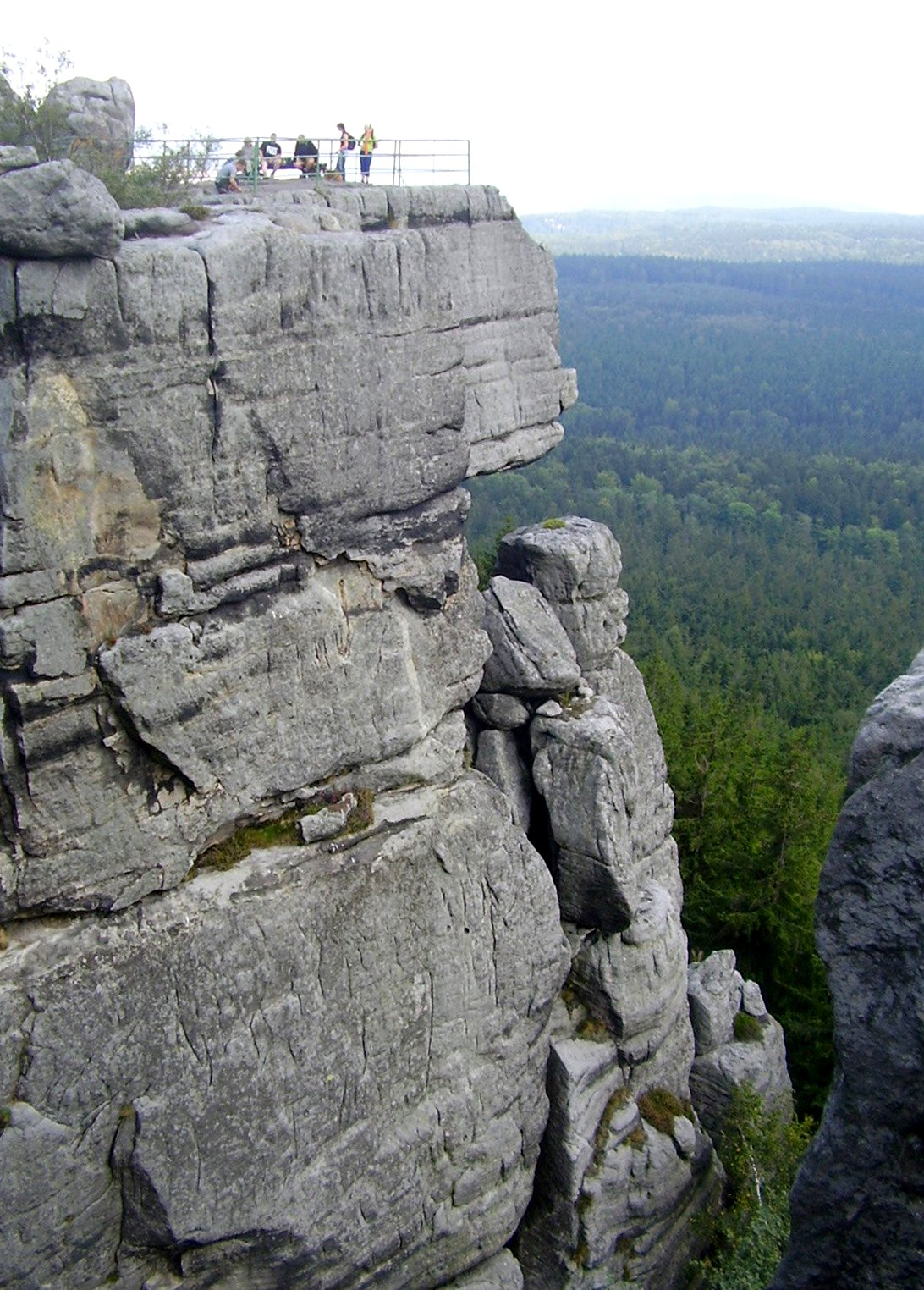
Szczeliniec Wielki

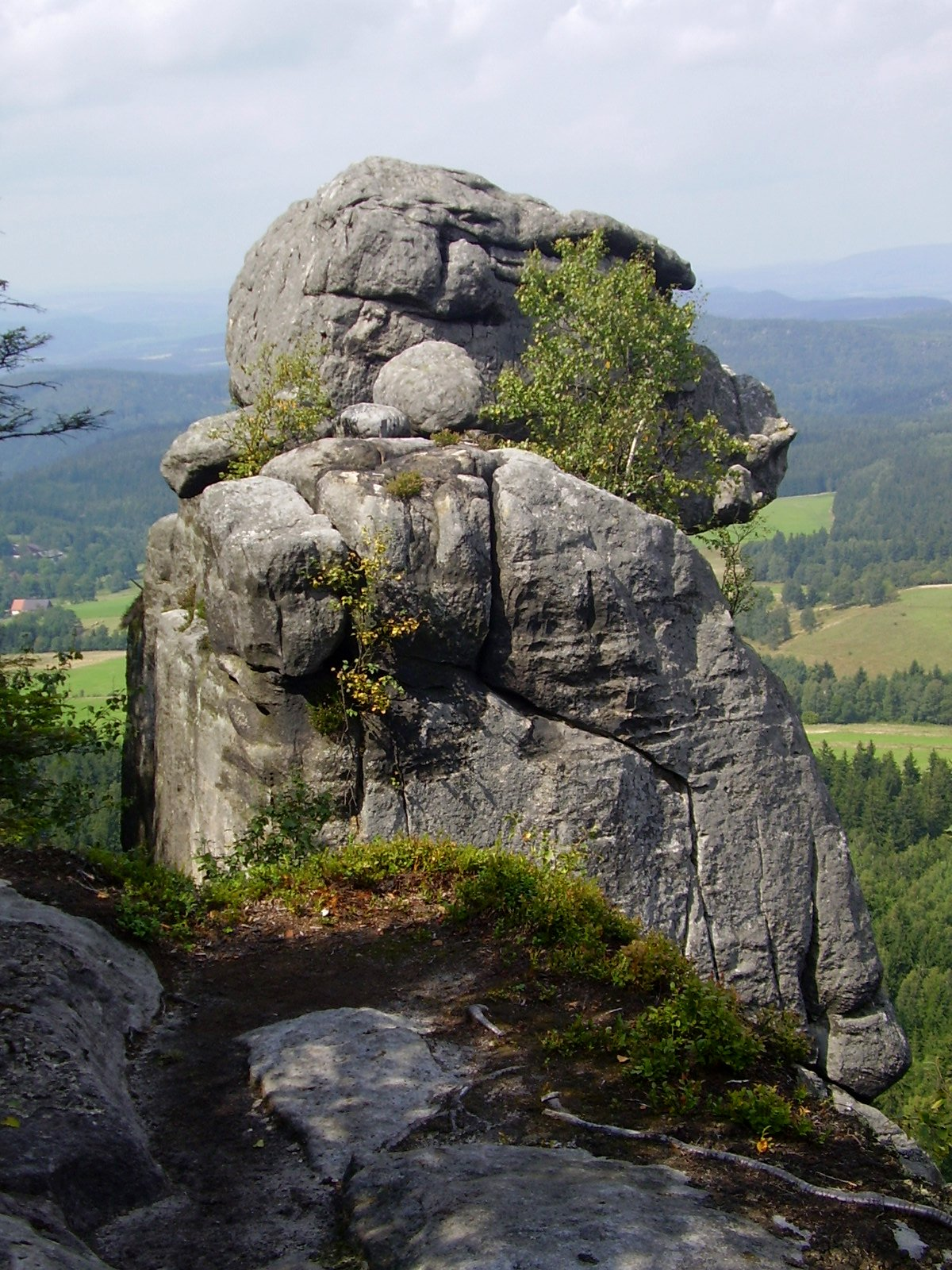
"Monkey" on Szczeliniec Wielki

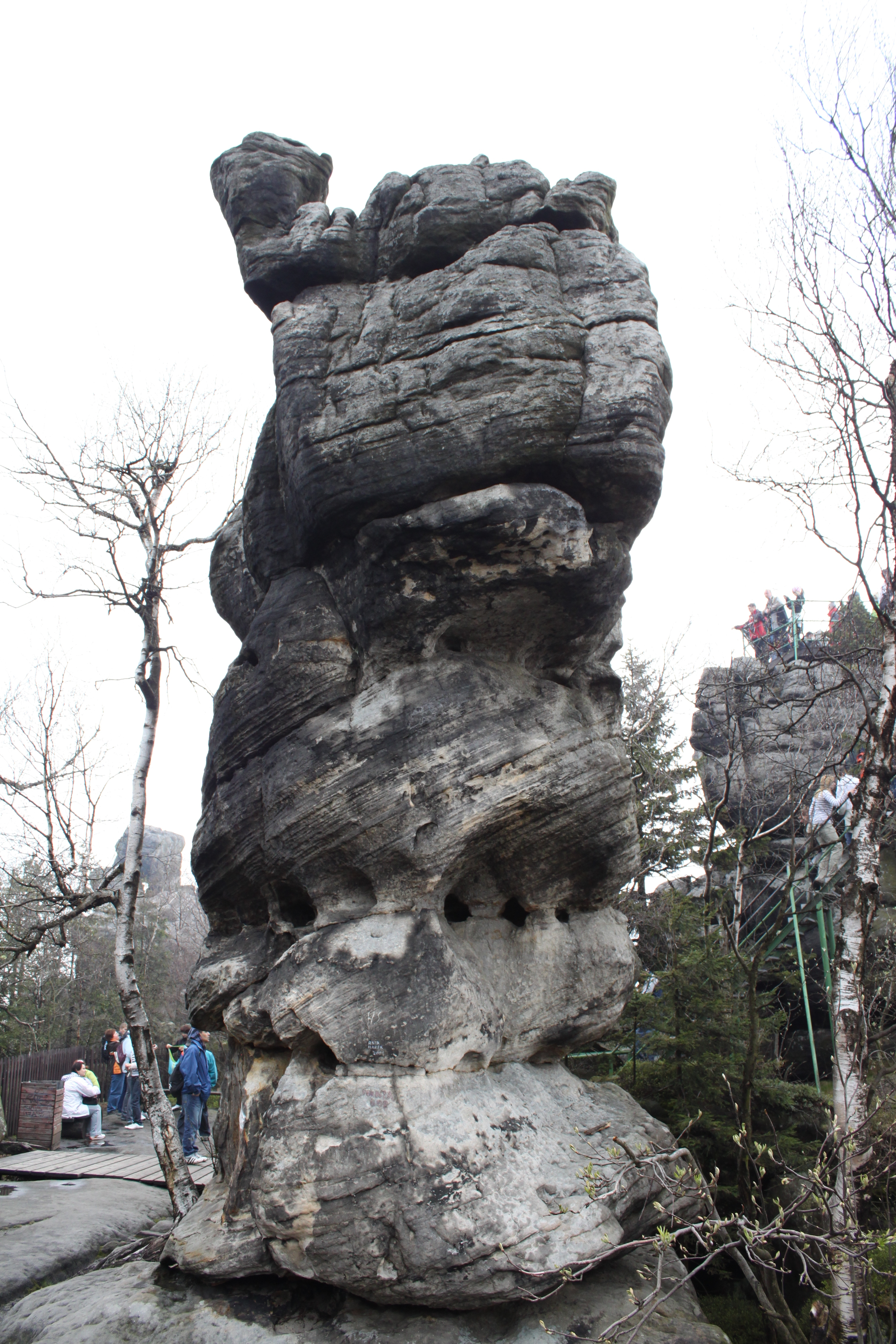
"Camel Rock" on Szczeliniec Wielki

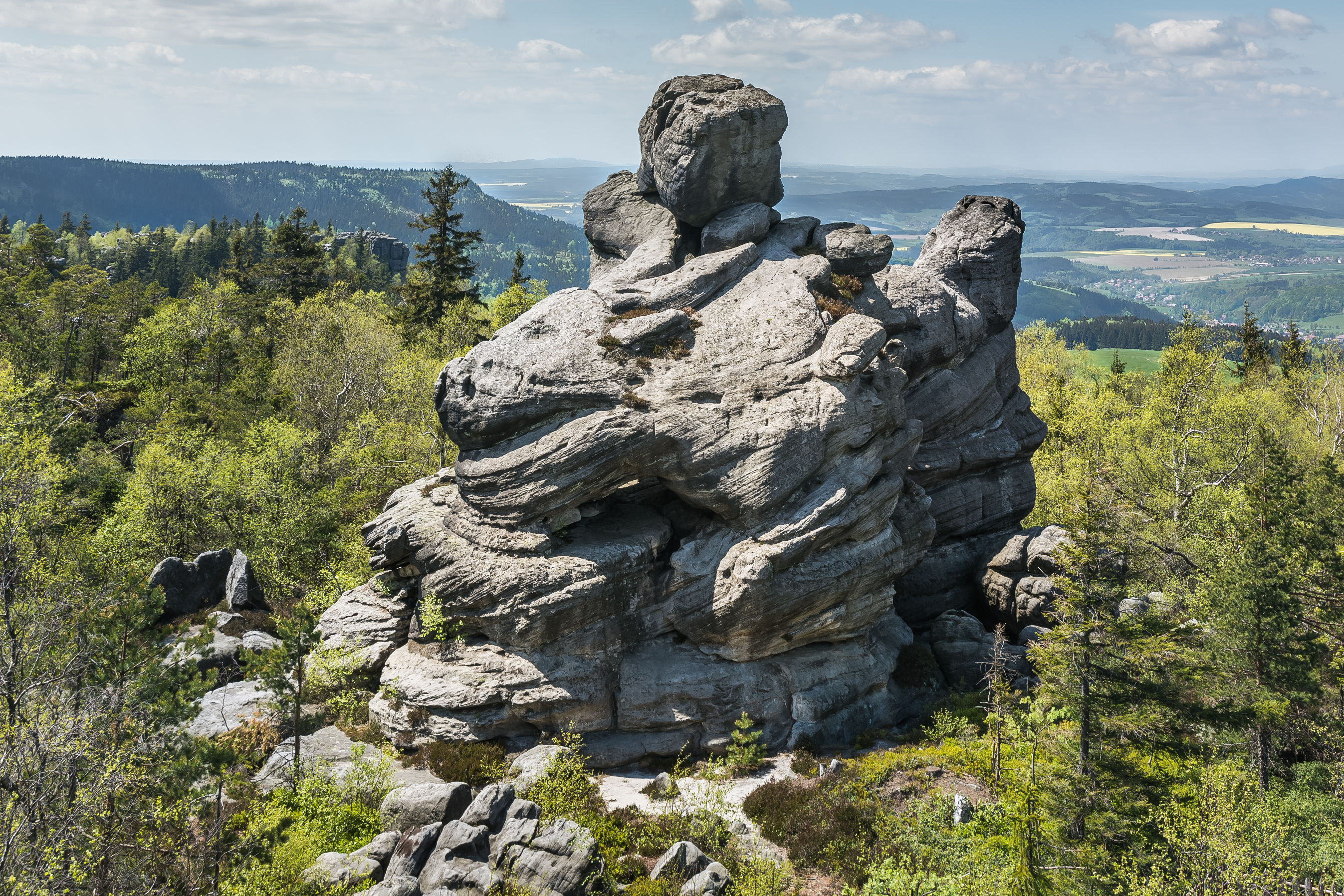
"Horse Head"

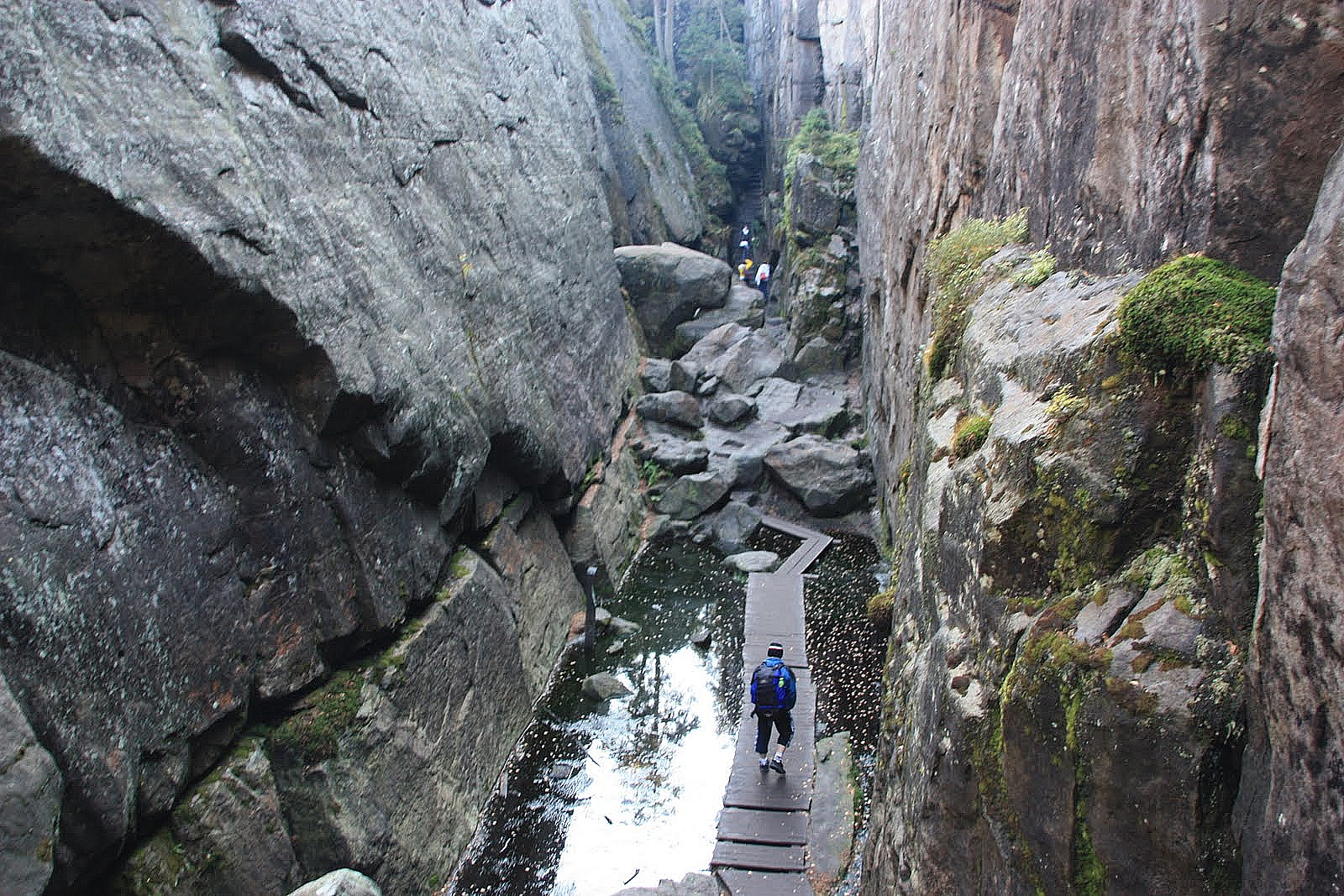
"Hell" gorge
