= Stołowe Mountains National Park =

National park in Poland

Coordinates: 50.2618°N 16.1422°E

Stołowe Mountains National Park Table Mountains National Park
- Park Narodowy Gór Stołowych
- IUCN category II (national park)
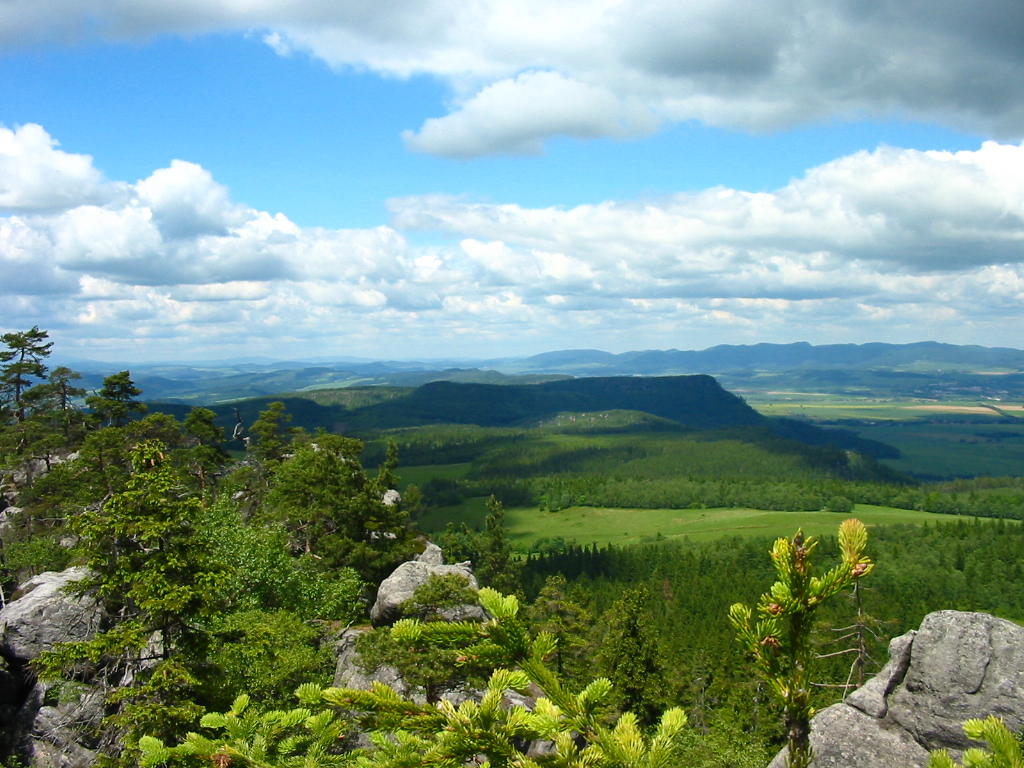
- View from Szczeliniec Wielki Park logo with Sandstone formation
- Location: Lower Silesian Voivodeship, Poland
- Area: 63.39 km^{2} (24.48 sq mi)
- Established: 1993
- Governing body: Ministry of the Environment
- Website: Official website

Stołowe Mountains National Park (Polish: Park Narodowy Gór Stołowych), anglicized to Table Mountains National Park, is a national park in southwestern Poland. It comprises the Polish section of the Stołowe Mountains (Góry Stołowe), which are part of the Sudetes range. It is located in Kłodzko County of the Lower Silesian Voivodeship, at the border with the Czech Republic. Created in 1993, the park covers an area of 63.39 square kilometres (24.48 sq mi), of which forests account for 57.79 km^{2}. The area of strict protection is 3.76 km^{2}.

== History ==
The landscape of the Table Mountains began to form 70 million years ago. The range's unique shape is a result of hundreds of thousands of years of erosion. There are several notable rock formations, among them Kwoka ("Hen"), Wielblad ("Camel") and Glowa wielkoluda ("Giant's head"). Also, there is a sophisticated system of corridors which creates rock labyrinths.

Currently, plant life is mostly made up of spruce, which was introduced to the area at the turn of the 19th century to replace pristine beech and fir forests, which had been cut. Natural woodland is scarce and covers only around 3% of the forested areas. There are peat bogs, one of which (area 393,000 m^{2}) was listed as a strictly protected area in 1959. In the forested areas of the park there are deer, red deer, wild pig, squirrels, hedgehogs, many birds and reptiles including lizards and adders.

== Flora ==
The characteristic flora of the Great Peatbog Batorowski, one of the few raised peat bogs in Poland, is represented by species such as marsh pine, marsh or ordinary heater. This peat bog has been subject to strict protection since 1958, and visitors to the Table Mountains National Park are not allowed on these sites.

== Inhabitation ==
The history of the Table Mountains is closely connected with the history of the Kłodzko region, located on the borderland of Silesia, Bohemia and Moravia. After Hussite wars of the 14th and 15th century, the area thrived and later on first spas at Kudowa, Duszniki and Polanica were opened. Duszniki is also a center of paper production – one of the first paper mills in Europe was opened there in 1605.

== In film ==
The Stołowe Mountains National Park served as a location for Andrew Adamson's 2008 fantasy film The Chronicles of Narnia: Prince Caspian. Places in which scenes where shot include the rock formation known as the Errant Rocks and the Kamieńczyk Gorge.

== Gallery ==
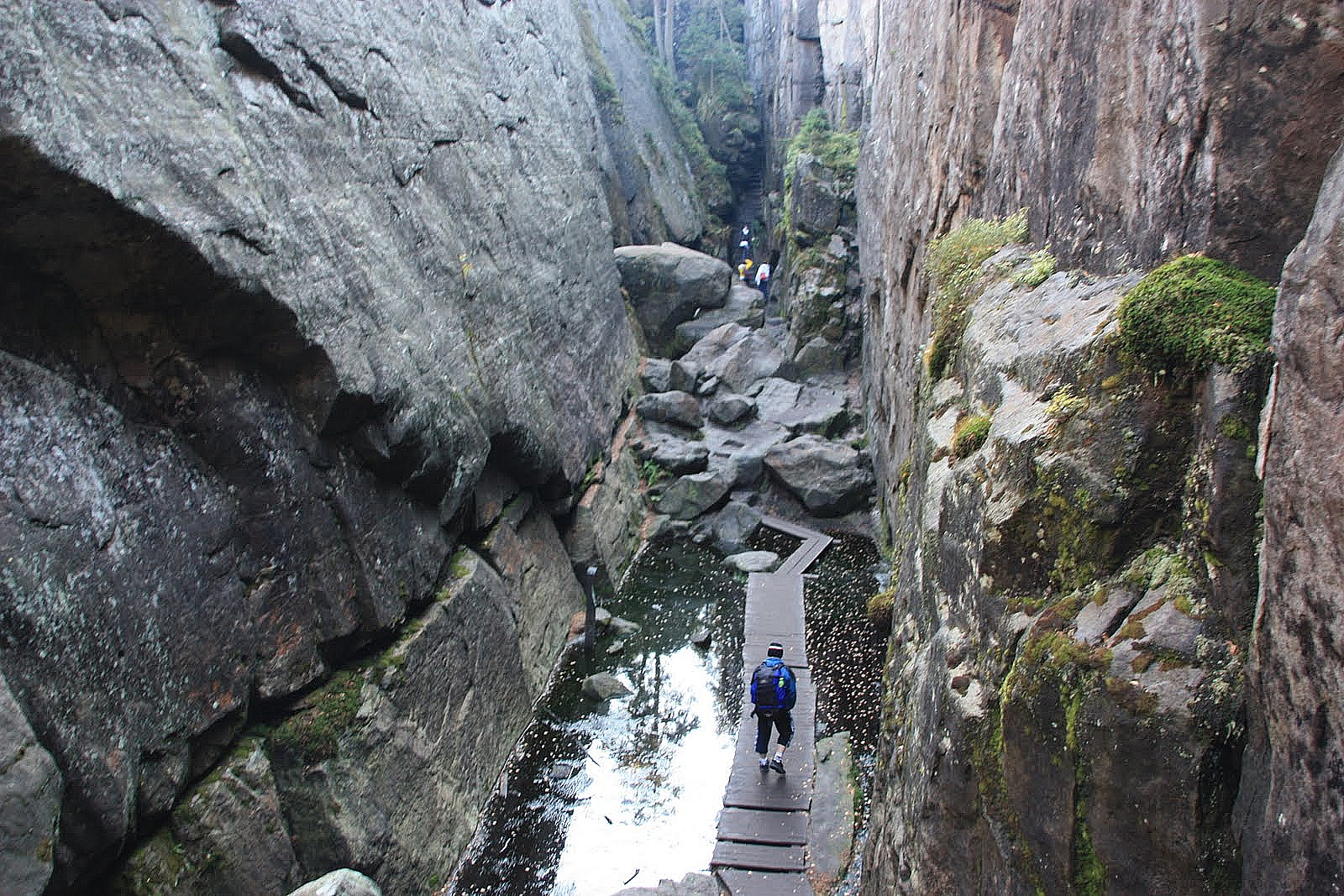
"Hell"

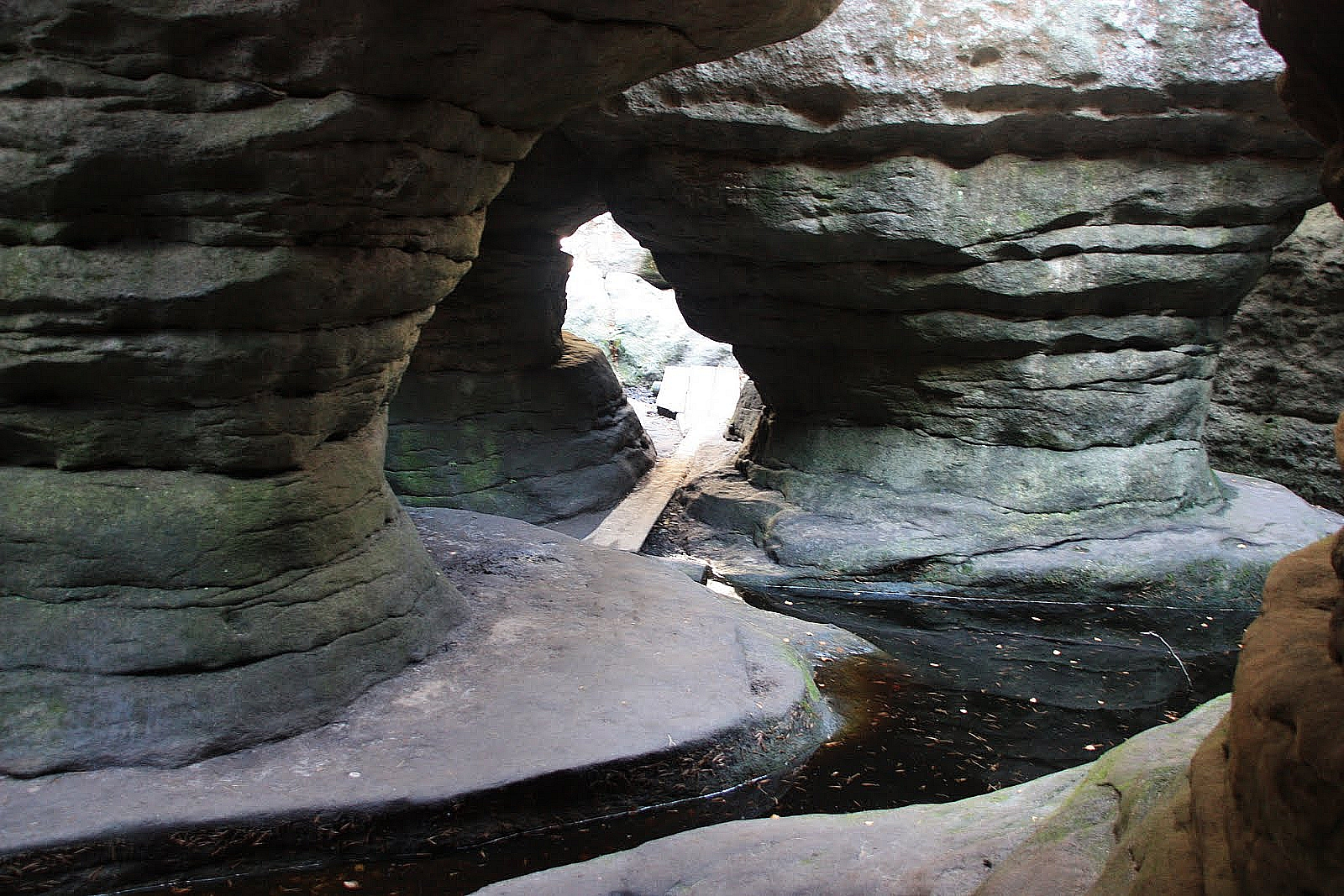
Errand Rocks (Polish: Błędne Skały)

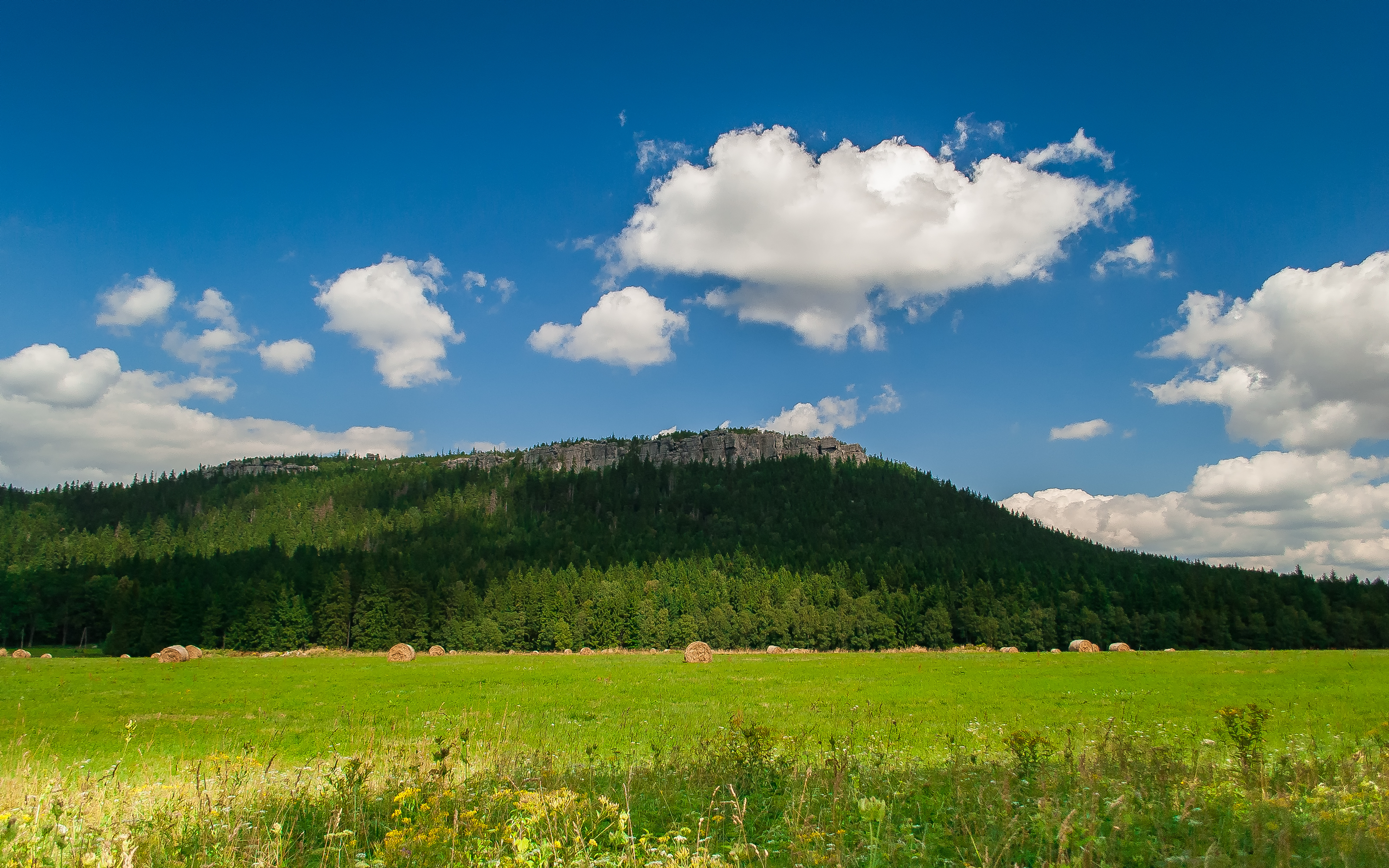
View of Szczeliniec Wielki

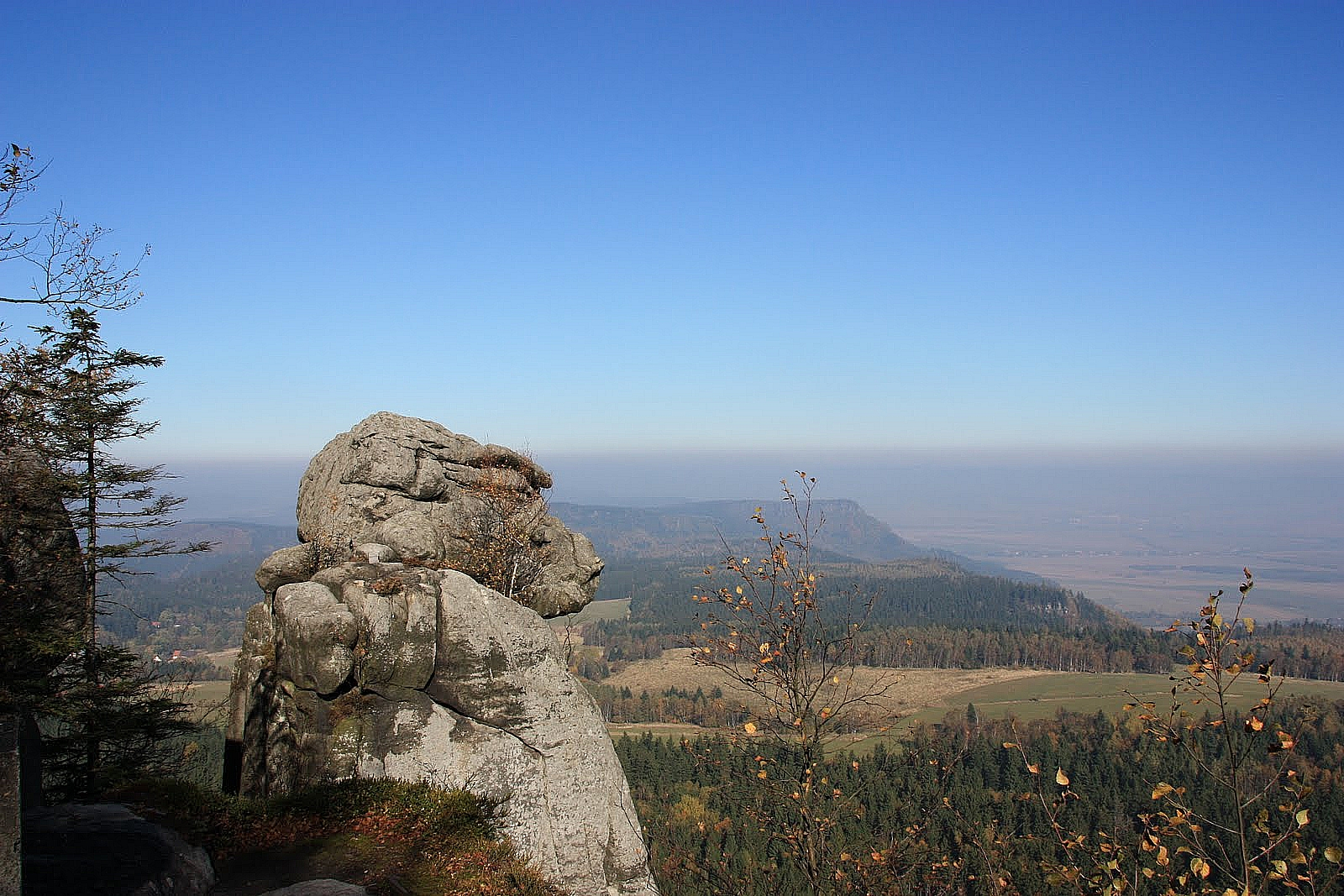
"Ape" on Szczeliniec Wielki

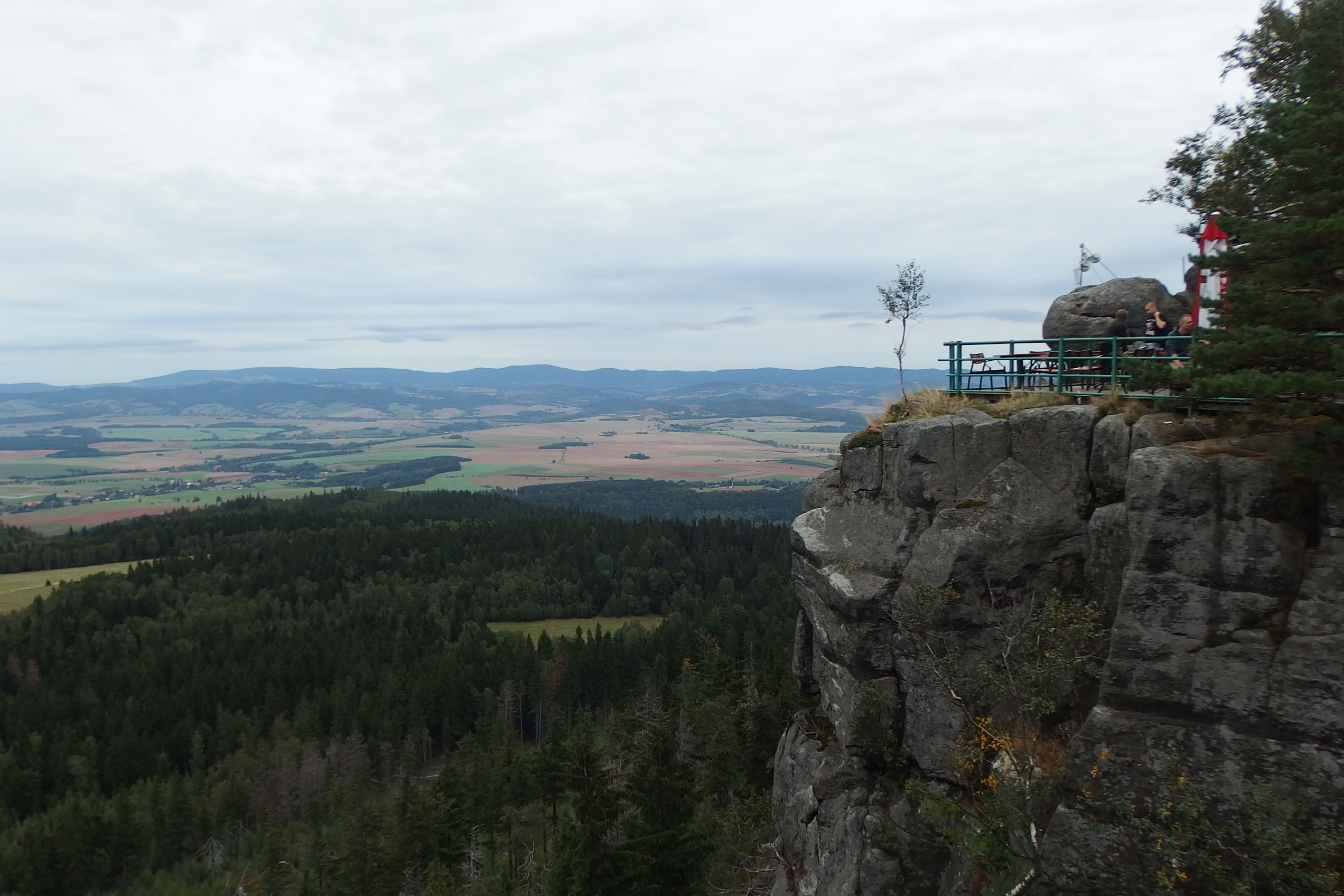
Szczeliniec Wielki

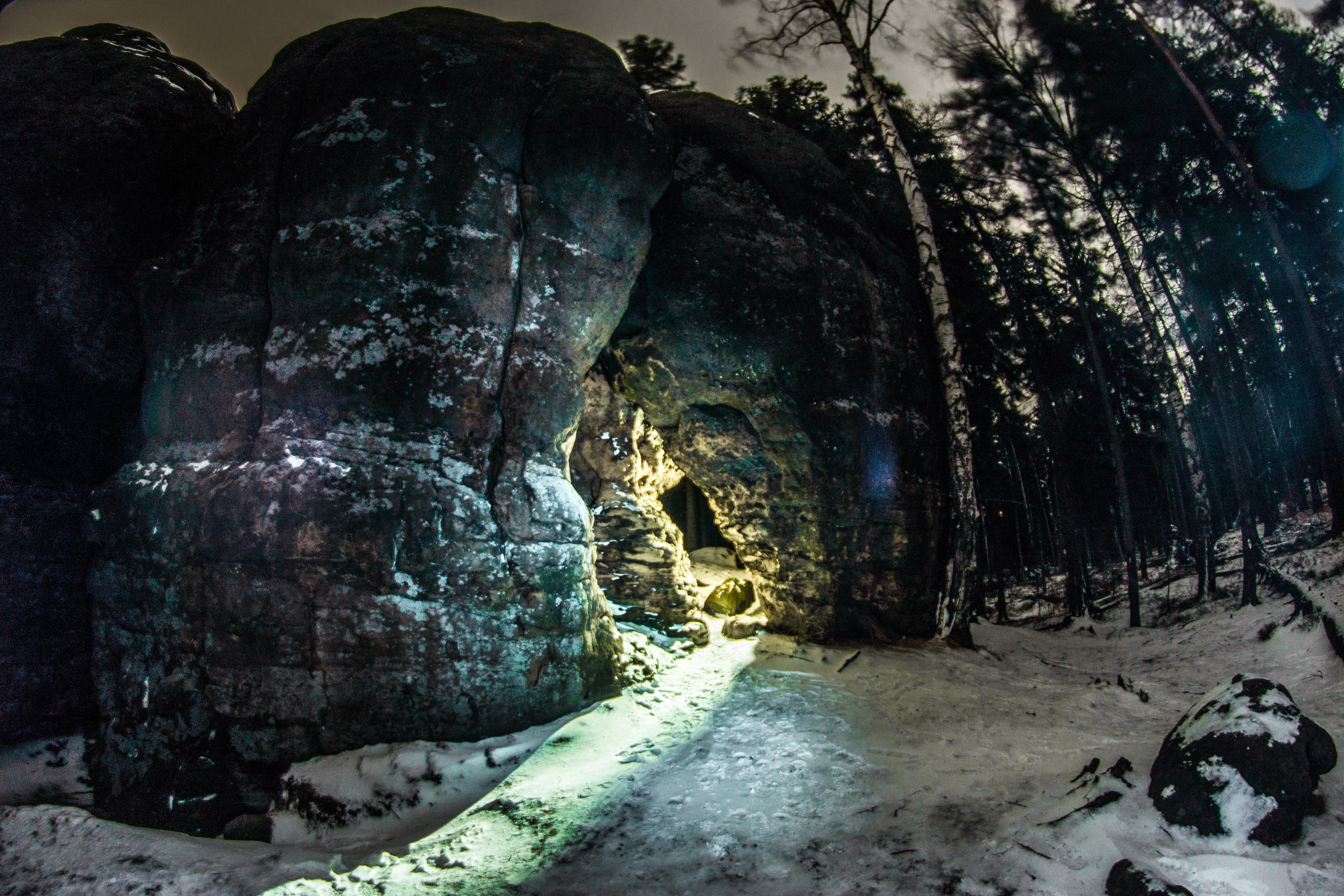
Rock towers (Polish: Skalne Baszty)

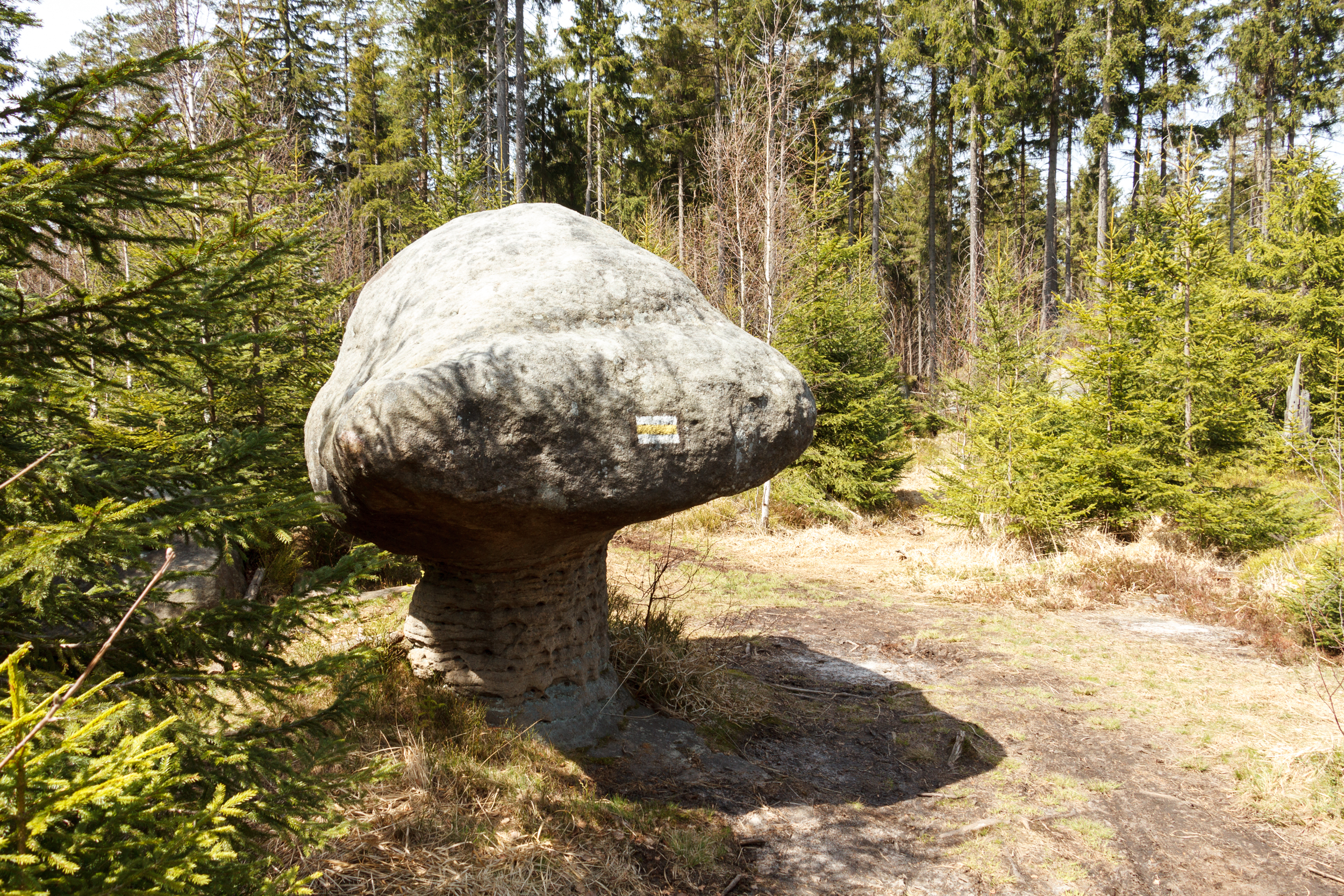
Rock mushrooms (Polish: Skalne Grzyby)

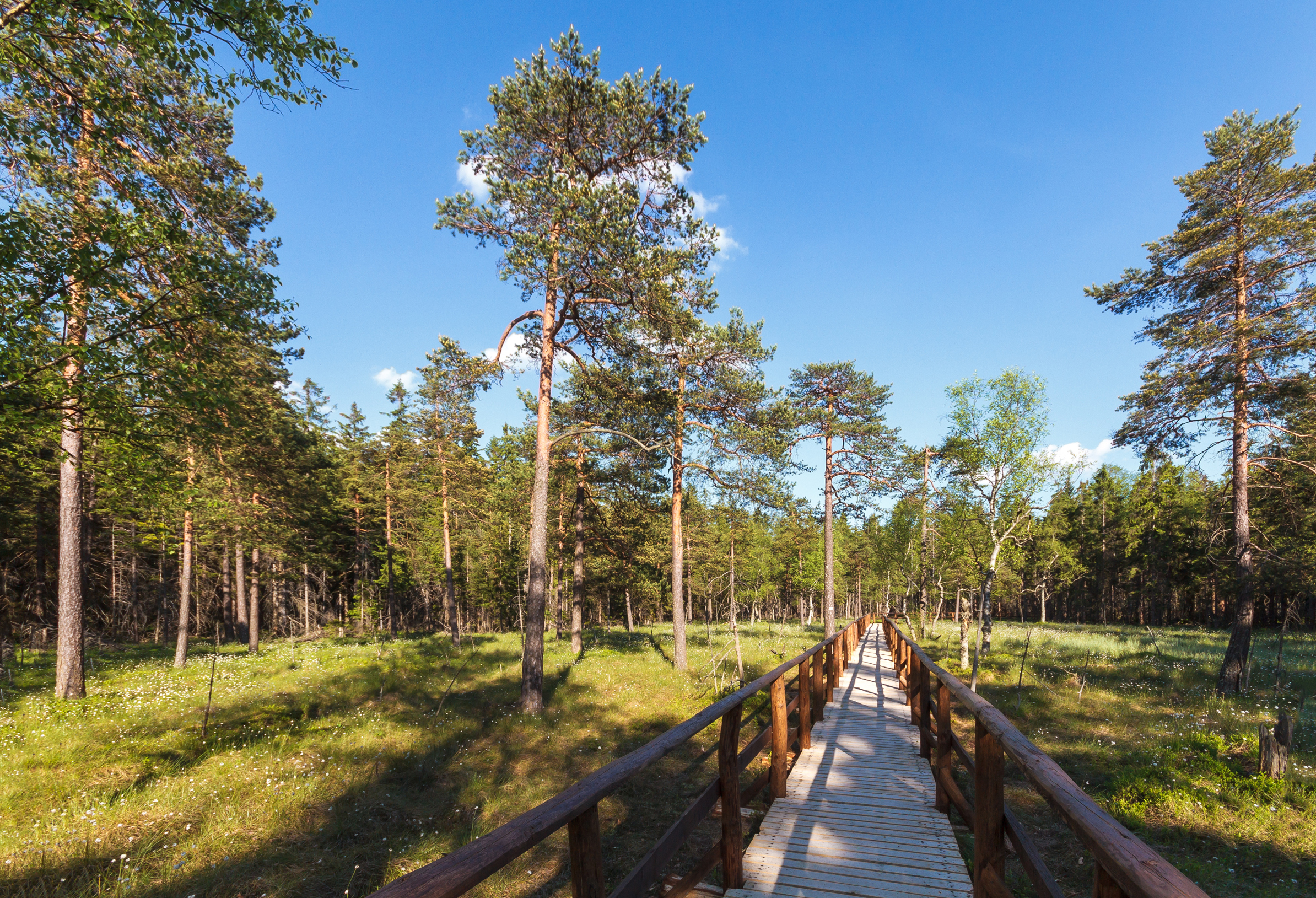
Vanishing meadow (Polish: Niknąca Łąka)

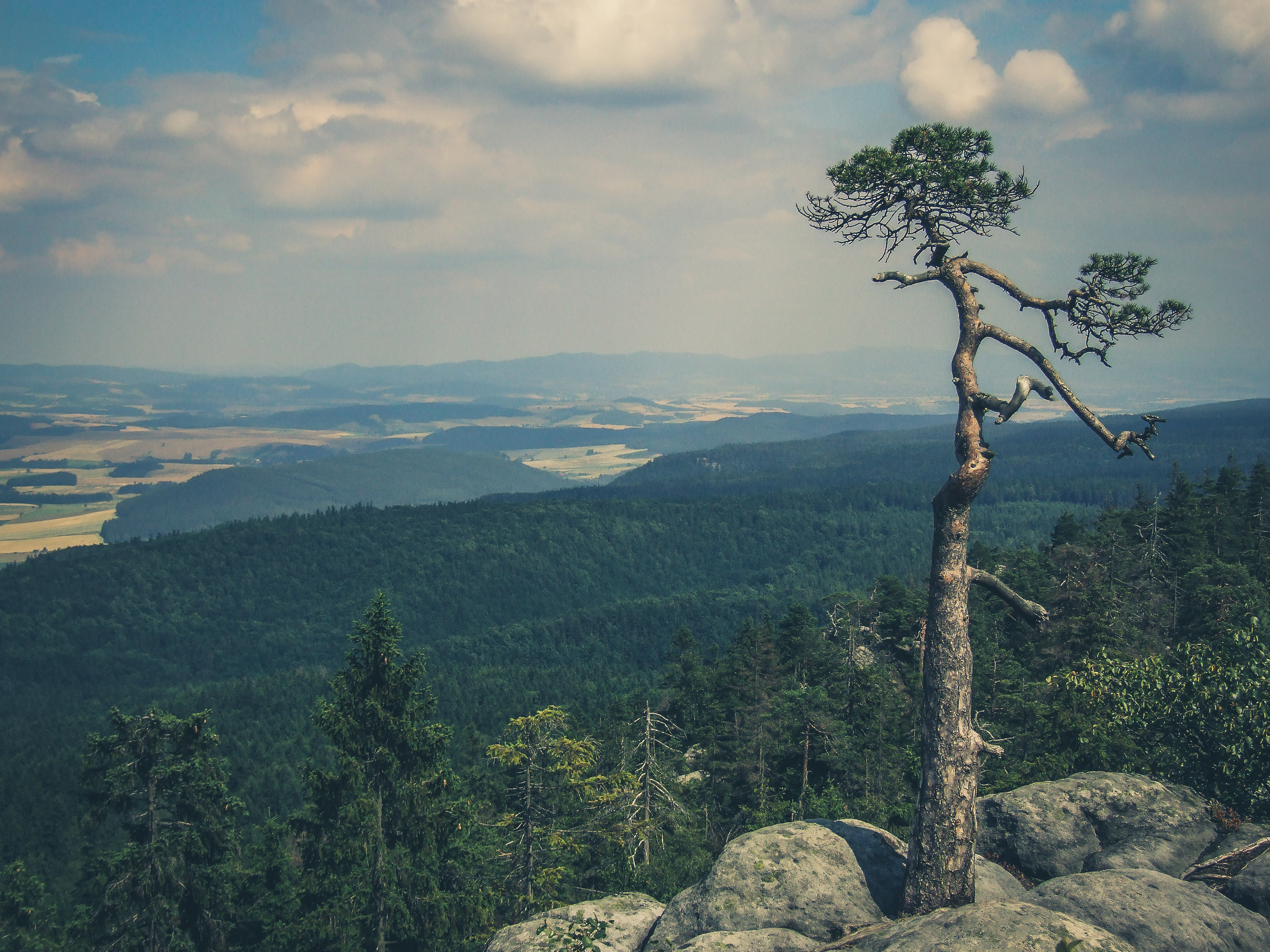
A panorama of the Sudety Mountains

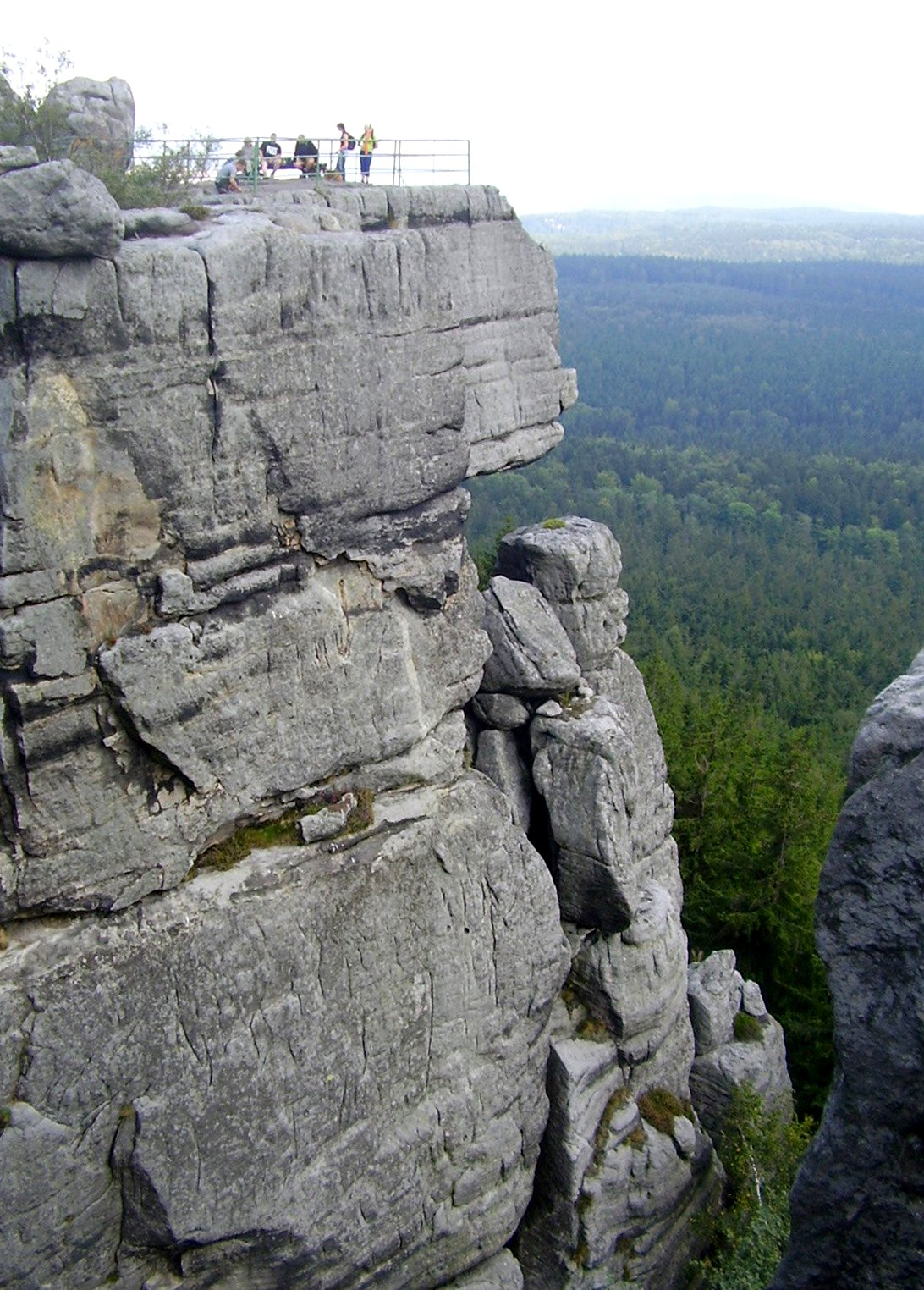
An observation deck on top of Szczeliniec Wielki

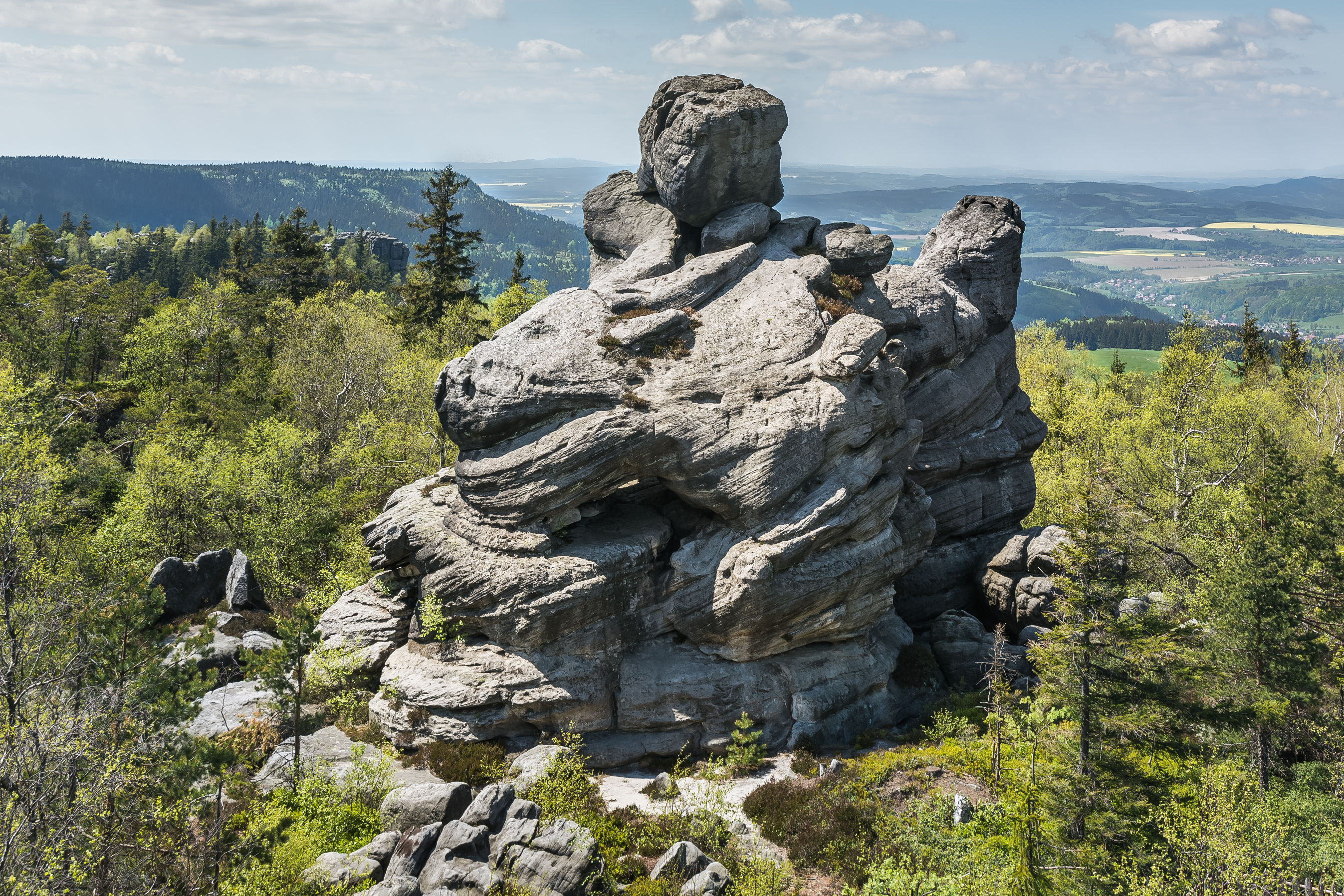
A rock formation in the park

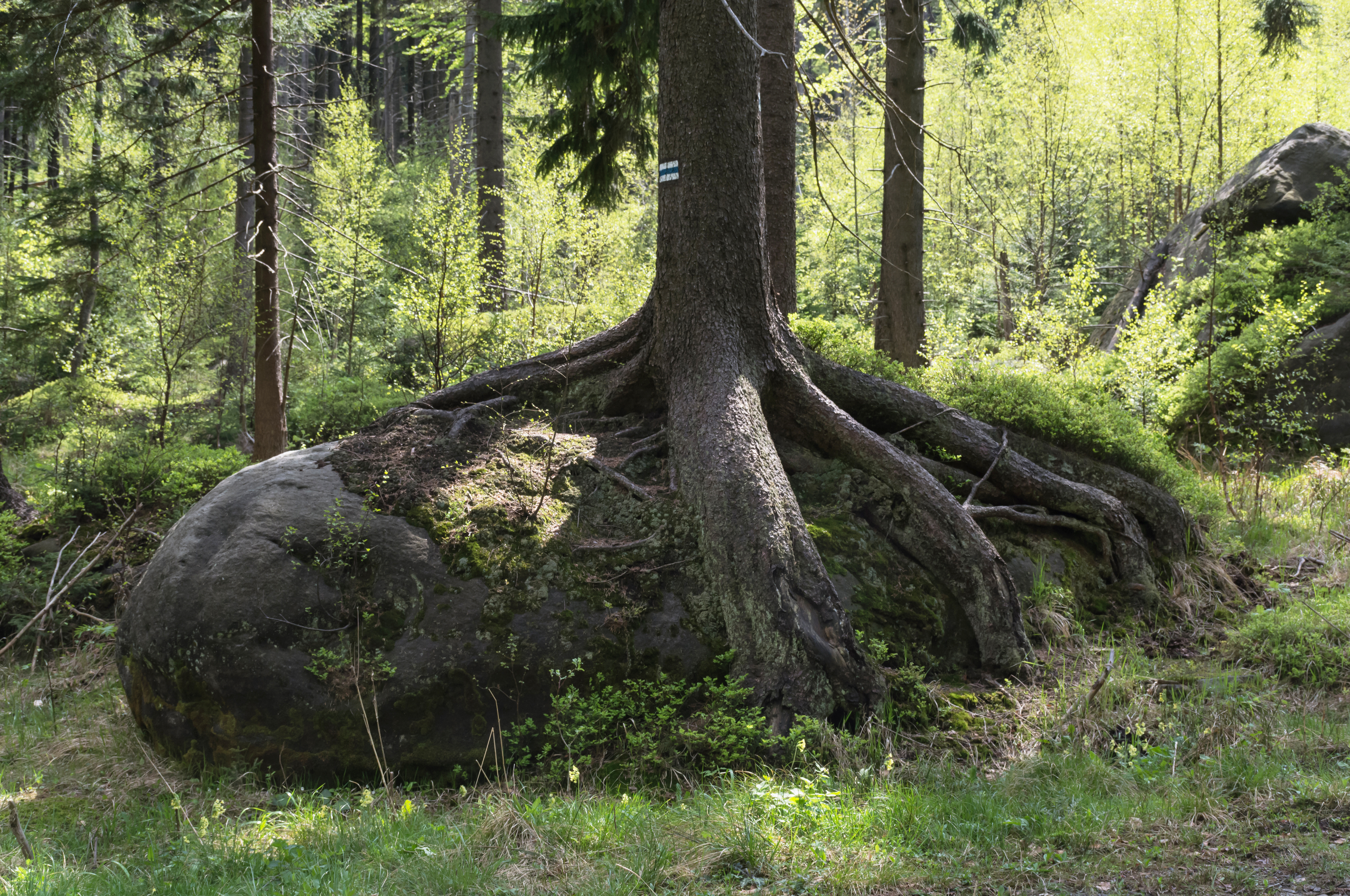
A boulder and spruce in the National Park
