= Karłów =

- Village
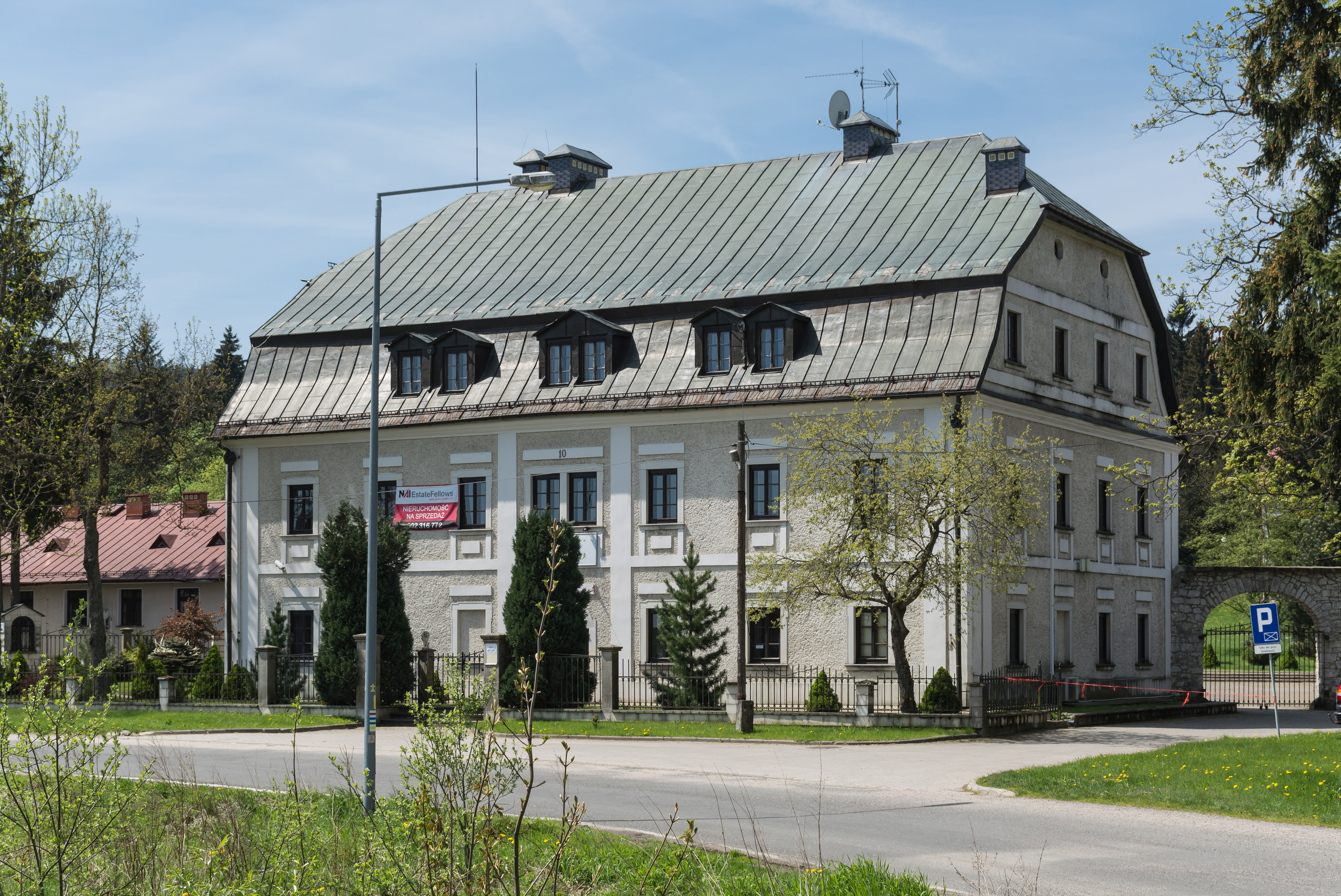

- Location within Poland
- Coordinates: 50°28′N 16°20′E
- Country: Poland
- Voivodeship: Lower Silesian
- County: Kłodzko
- Gmina: Radków
- Elevation: 750 m (2,460 ft)
- Website: http://karlow.pl

Karłów [ˈkarwuf] is a village in the administrative district of Gmina Radków, within Kłodzko County, Lower Silesian Voivodeship, in south-western Poland.
