= Treaty of Reichenbach =

The Treaties of Reichenbach were agreements signed in Reichenbach (present-day Dzierżoniów).

- Treaty of Reichenbach (1790)
- Treaties of Reichenbach (1813)
