= Gmina Pieszyce =

Gmina Pieszyce Pieszyce Commune
- Gmina
- Coat of arms
- Interactive map of Gmina Pieszyce
- Coordinates (Pieszyce): 50°43′N 16°35′E
- Country: Poland
- Voivodeship: Lower Silesian
- County: Dzierżoniów
- Seat: Pieszyce

Area
  - Total: 64.64 km^{2} (24.96 sq mi)

Population (2019-06-30)
  - Total: 9,466
  - Density: 146.4/km^{2} (379.3/sq mi)
  - Urban: 7,123
  - Rural: 2,343
- Website: http://www.um.pieszyce.pl/

Gmina Pieszyce is an urban-rural gmina (administrative district) in Dzierżoniów County, Lower Silesian Voivodeship, in south-western Poland. Its seat is the town of Pieszyce. The gmina was created in 2016 as previously it was an urban gmina, by giving a village status to four parts of Pieszyce town.

The gmina covers an area of 64.64 square kilometres (25.0 sq mi), and as of 2019 its total population is 9,466.

== Villages ==
Apart from the town of Pieszyce, Gmina Pieszyce contains the villages and settlements of Bratoszów, Kamionki, Piskorzów and Rościszów.

== Neighbouring gminas ==
Gmina Pieszyce is bordered by the towns of Bielawa and Dzierżoniów and gminas of Świdnica, Dzierżoniów, Walim and Nowa Ruda.

== Twin towns – sister cities ==
Gmina Pieszyce is twinned with:

- Schortens, Germany
- Świecie, Poland
