= Jakub Egit =

Canadian writer

Jakub Egit (27 September 1908 – 1996) was a Polish Jewish leader. He was born in Boryslaw, Austria-Hungary. His parents, Marek and Shaindel, and his siblings, Marcus, Rachel, Reisl, Jonas and Genia, were all killed between 1943 and 1945.

In 1945, Egit began a project to create a settlement of 50,000 Jews in Dzierżoniów County (formerly Reichenbach), incl. the town of Dzierżoniów (the peak number of Jews in Drobniszew reached 17,800 in November 1946), Bielawa, Pieszyce, Piława Górna, etc., a Recovered Territory near Wrocław in Silesia, People's Republic of Poland. Egit wanted to make the former German territory into a Jewish settlement. Initially, with Soviet Communist support, Egit's plan went well; starting with a small group of concentration camp survivors, the settlement grew to encompass Jewish schools, hospitals, kibbutzim, orphanages and a book publisher in Wrocław. However, in 1948 the Communists withdrew their support. Egit was put in jail and the majority of Dzierżoniów's citizens subsequently emigrated to Israel.

From his release in 1950, Egit was editor of J'idysz Buch in Warsaw. In 1957 he emigrated to Canada, where he became a prominent member of Canada's Jewish community. In 1991, he published his autobiography Grand Illusion.

Egit died in Florida in 1996.
