= Treaties of Reichenbach (1813) =

1813 series of agreements

The Treaties of Reichenbach were a series of agreements signed in Reichenbach (present-day Dzierżoniów) between Great Britain, Prussia, Russia, and Austria. These accords served to establish and strengthen a united coalition force against Napoleon I of France.

== Specific terms ==
On 14 June 1813 the Treaty of Reichenbach was signed between Great Britain and Prussia. The British were represented by Sir Charles Stewart, the half-brother of Foreign Secretary Lord Castlereagh, who had been named the British ambassador to Prussia. The Prussians initially wanted Britain to fund 100,000 men but Castlereagh, suspicious of the poorly trained state of the Prussian army, insisted on paying for 80,000 only. To maintain this force, Britain agreed to provide Prussia a subsidy of 666,666 pounds sterling. In exchange for this aid, the king of Prussia agreed to cede the principality of Hildesheim and other territories to the Electorate of Hanover, enlarging the latter by 250,000-300,000 people.

On 15 June 1813 the Treaty of Reichenbach was signed between Great Britain and Russia. The negotiations for this treaty were led by the British ambassador to Russia, Lord Cathcart. The British initially wanted Russia to send 200,000 troops against Napoleon while Alexander I of Russia maintained he could only spare 150,000. After difficult negotiations, the sides agreed that Russia will supply 160,000 troops while Britain will provide Russia with a subsidy of 1,333,334 pounds sterling to pay for them.

On 27 June 1813 the Treaty of Reichenbach (also known as the Reichenbach Convention) was signed between Prussia, Russia, and Austria. The driving force behind this treaty was Clemens von Metternich, the Austrian chancellor. It was signed by Count Nesselrode for Russia and Prince von Hardenberg for Prussia. Based on the terms of the accord, Austria agreed to mediate with Napoleon and to declare war against Napoleon if he didn't agree to the Allied peace conditions by 20 July 1813. The conditions of peace to be presented to Napoleon included:

- Surrendering the Illyrian Provinces to Austria
- Recognizing the independence of the German states of the Confederation of the Rhine
- Removing French troops from Germany and Italy
- Giving up the Duchy of Warsaw and leaving the post-war settlement in the hands of the Allies
- Restoring independence to Hesse-Kassel, Hanover, and free cities of Hamburg and Lübeck
- Returning the Papal States, Piedmont and the German possessions of the House of Orange to their previous owners
- Restoring Prussia to its 1806 borders.

== Aftermath ==
The British did not sign on the Reichenbach convention and were unhappy with the limited demands of the Allies. Lord Castlereagh informed his representatives in the Allied camp, Cathcart and Stewart, that Spain and Sicily were not to be abandoned, Ferdinand VII was to be restored to the Spanish throne, Holland was to be given up by France and the Kingdom of Italy returned to its old masters. The peace terms presented by Metternich to Napoleon at Dresden were peremptorily refused by the French emperor. Although a French representative, Caulaincourt, was dispatched to the Prague Peace Congress of July-August 1813, he had not been given the requisite credentials by Napoleon. As a consequence, Austria declared war on France on 12 August.

== See also ==
- List of treaties

== Sources ==
- Clare, Israel Smith. Library of Universal History: Containing a Record of the Human Race from the Earliest Historical Period to the Present Time Embracing a General Survey of the Progress of Mankind in National and Social Life, Civil Government, Religion, Literature, Science and Art. R. S. Peale, J. A. Hill, 1897 (Original from the New York Public Library).
