= Paweł Piwko =

Polish handball player (born 1982)

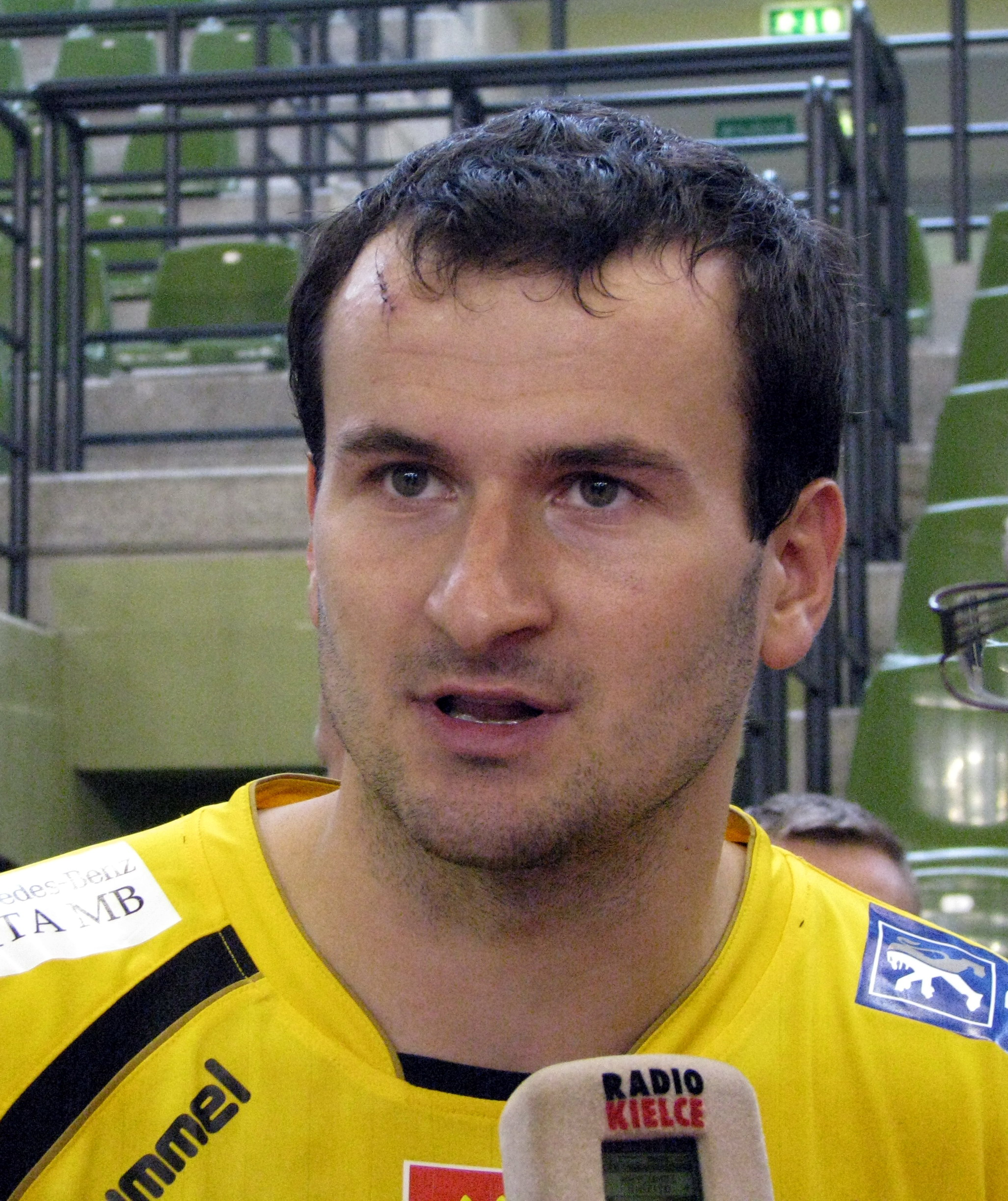
Paweł Piwko.

Paweł Piwko (born 7 October 1982) is a Polish team handball player.

He participated at the 2008 Summer Olympics, where Poland finished 5th.

He was born in Dzierżoniów.
