= Bianka Blume =

German opera singer (1843–1896)

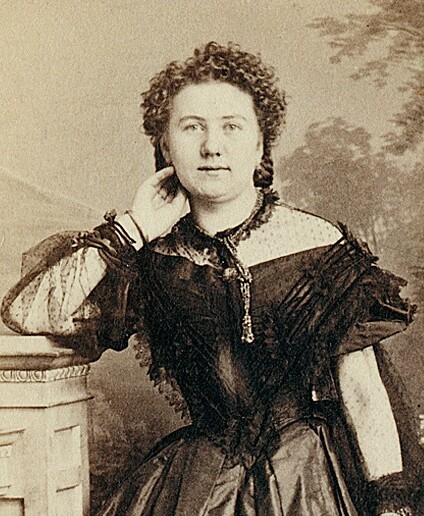
- Bianka Blume in c. 1865
- Born: Bianka George; 4 May 1843; Reichenbach, Prussia
- Died: 1896 (aged 52–53); Buenos Aires, Argentina
- Other names: Bianka Blume-Sauter
- Occupation: Opera singer
- Spouse: Alfred Blume (m. 1866)

Bianka Blume (4 May 1843 – December 1896) was a German soprano opera singer.

== Early life ==
Bianka George was born on 4 May 1843 in Reichenbach and was the daughter of a music and book dealer. After being orphaned at an early age, she was adopted by lithographic printer George Sauter in Wrocław. Originally, she had wanted to become a teacher but beginning at age 14, she took private singing lessons with Wrocław choir director Julius Hirschberg, and from the age of 15, started to perform concerts. In 1859, she sang the soprano solo of Emma Mampe-Babnigg in Joseph Haydn's The Creation, after the latter suddenly fell ill. Blume's performance was positively received, despite the fact that she had never sung those solos before.

== Career ==
In 1861, she officially began her career as Alice in Giacomo Meyerbeer's Robert le diable at the Wrocław Opera. In July 1862, she portrayed Agathe and Anna in François-Adrien Boieldieu's La dame blanche. She was then engaged in Magdeburg and subsequently employed by the Berlin State Opera, starting in January 1863 until 1866. Despite her experience on stage, Blume continued to have singing lessons with Professor Sieber and acting lessons with Adele Peroni-Glasbrenner. In 1866, she went to the Königliches Hoftheater Dresden, but returned to Berlin the next year. After which she was engaged at the Mannheim National Theatre. Blume soon stopped performing permanent engagements and instead embarked on guest performances around Europe.

In 1869, she played Lady Macbeth in Giuseppe Verdi's Macbeth at the Teatro Argentina in Rome. The subsequent year she performed as both Rachel in La Juive and reprised her role as Alice in Robert le diable at the La Scala opera house in Milan. For the next two years, Blume performed as a guest in Naples at the Teatro di San Carlo. She also appeared as a guest at the Bavarian State Opera in 1872. The year after, Blume undertook a tour of South America with the tenor Enrico Tamberlik.

== Personal life ==
On 25 May 1866, she married singing teacher Alfred Blume and began performing under the name Bianka Blume-Sauter.

Blume died in Buenos Aires in December 1896, at the age of 53.
