= Jan Czuwara =

Polish handball player (born 1995)

Personal information
- Nationality: Polish
- Born: 18 October 1995 (age 31) Dzierżoniów, Poland
- Height: 1.84 m (6 ft 0 in)

Sport
- Sport: Handball
- Position: Left wing
- Current club: Zagłębie Lubin

Youth career
- Years: Team
- 2008–2011: Żagiew Dzierżoniów

Senior clubs
- Years: Team
- 2011–2014: Miedź Legnica
- 2014–2018: Zagłębie Lubin
- 2018–2021: NMC Górnik Zabrze
- 2021–2023: RK Vardar 1961
- 2024–: Zagłębie Lubin
National team
Years	Team	Apps	(Gls)
2017–	Poland	71	(142)
- Updated on 12 January 2025

Jan Czuwara (born 18 October 1995) is a Polish handball player for Zagłębie Lubin and the Polish national team.

He represented Poland at the 2020 European Men's Handball Championship.

== Honors ==
- Macedonian Handball Super League

Winner: 2022

- Macedonian Handball Cup

Winner: 2022, 2023
