= Treaty of Reichenbach (1790) =

1790 treaty between Prussia and Austria

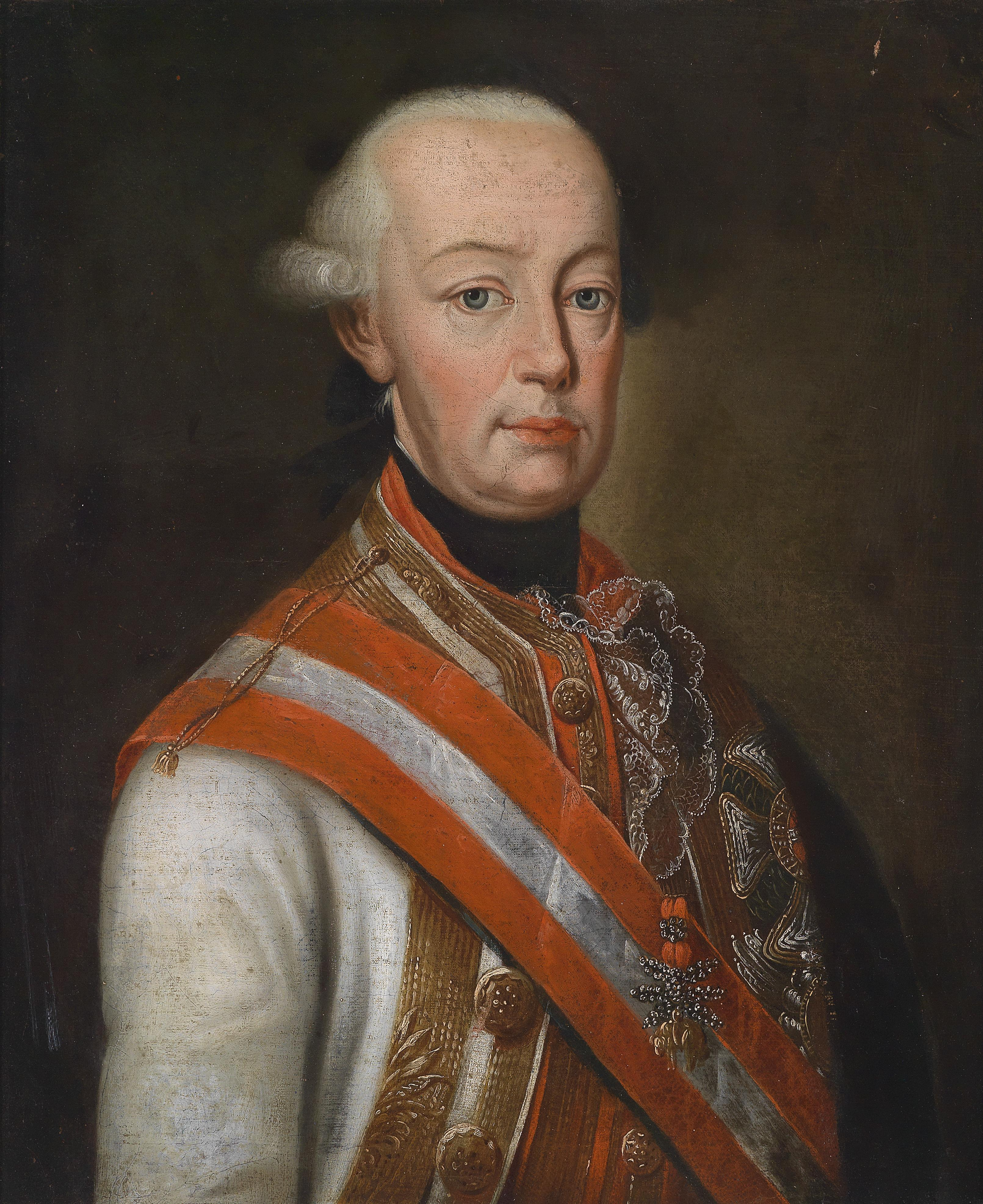
Portrait of Kaiser Leopold II c. 1790

The Treaty of Reichenbach was signed on July 27, 1790 in Reichenbach (present-day Dzierżoniów) between Prussia under King Frederick William II and Austria under Leopold II, who was also Holy Roman Emperor. The two countries tried to settle their differences, specifically Leopold attempted to be conciliatory toward Prussia, as Austria and Russia had recently made gains against the Ottoman Empire.

== Terms ==
Based on the terms of the treaty, Austria agreed to restore all conquered territories to the Ottoman Empire. Moreover, Austria agreed to grant the Belgians both amnesty and their old constitution. The Prussian statesman, Count Ewald Friedrich of Hertzberg, managed to insert a clause whereby Austria would be able to make small acquisitions of Ottoman territory. However, Austria must first receive permission from the Sublime Porte and must also allow Prussia to acquire an equivalent amount of Ottoman territory. Even though Austria had to relinquish its conquered territories to the Ottoman Empire, it was allowed to retain its garrison in Chotin. Moreover, the accord guaranteed protection of the Bosnian frontier. In return for these concessions, Prussia made herself responsible for several stipulated compensations. In another aspect of the treaty, Austria was not allowed to overtly or covertly support Russia in its campaigns against the Sublime Porte.

== Results ==
Due to Leopold's diplomatic skill and sense of moderation, Austria attained a diplomatic victory through the treaty. In other words, the Treaty of Reichenbach helped to strengthen the level of respect Leopold received from foreign powers. Moreover, the accord helped Austria to focus on establishing peace within its own territories. Prussia, on the other hand, was forced to abandon its plans for expansion, as well as any attempts to acquire strategic benefits from Austria's losses. The Treaty of Reichenbach is seen by historians as a significant marker representing a Prussian retreat from the policies of Frederick the Great, as well as the beginning of Prussia's decline that found its nadir at the Battle of Jena.

== See also ==
- List of treaties

== Sources ==
- Lodge, Richard. The Student's Modern Europe: A History of Modern Europe. From the Capture of Constantinople, 1453, To The Treaty of Berlin, 1878. American Book Company, 1885 (Originally from Harvard University).
- Williams, Henry Smith. The Historians' History of the World: A Comprehensive Narrative of the Rise and Development of Nations as Recorded by over Two Thousand of the Great Writers of all Ages. The Times, 1907.
