= Pieszyce =

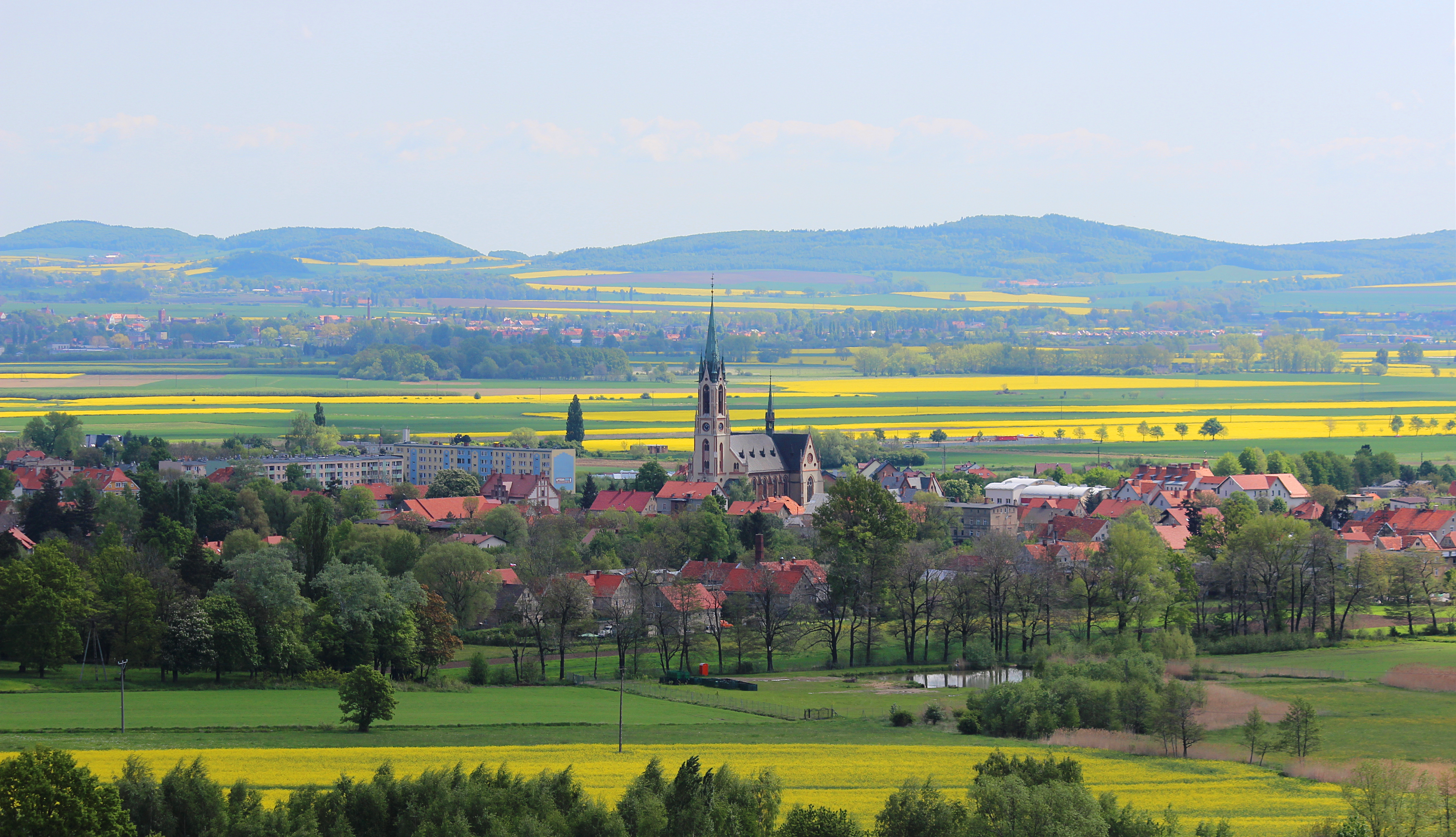
- Panorama of Pieszyce with the church of St. Anthony

- Coat of arms

- Location within Poland Location within Lower Silesian Voivodeship
- Coordinates: 50°42′44″N 16°34′51″E
- Country: Poland
- Voivodeship: Lower Silesian
- County: Dzierżoniów
- Gmina: Pieszyce
- First mentioned: 13th century
- Town rights: 1962

Government
  - Mayor: Dorota Konieczna-Enözel

Area
  - Total: 17.72 km^{2} (6.84 sq mi)

Population (2019-06-30)
  - Total: 7,123
  - Density: 402.0/km^{2} (1,041/sq mi)
- Time zone: UTC+1 (CET)
  - Summer (DST): UTC+2 (CEST)
- Area code: +48 74
- License plates: DDZ
- Website: http://www.pieszyce.pl/

Pieszyce [pʲɛˈʂɨt͡sɛ] (German: Peterswaldau) is a town in Dzierżoniów County, Lower Silesian Voivodeship, in south-western Poland. It is the seat of the administrative district (gmina) Gmina Pieszyce.

== Geography ==
It is situated in the historic Lower Silesia region on the northern slopes of the Owl Mountains, approximately 5 kilometres (3 mi) southwest of Dzierżoniów, and 56 kilometres (35 mi) southwest of the regional capital Wrocław.

As of 2019, the town has a population of 7,123.

== History ==
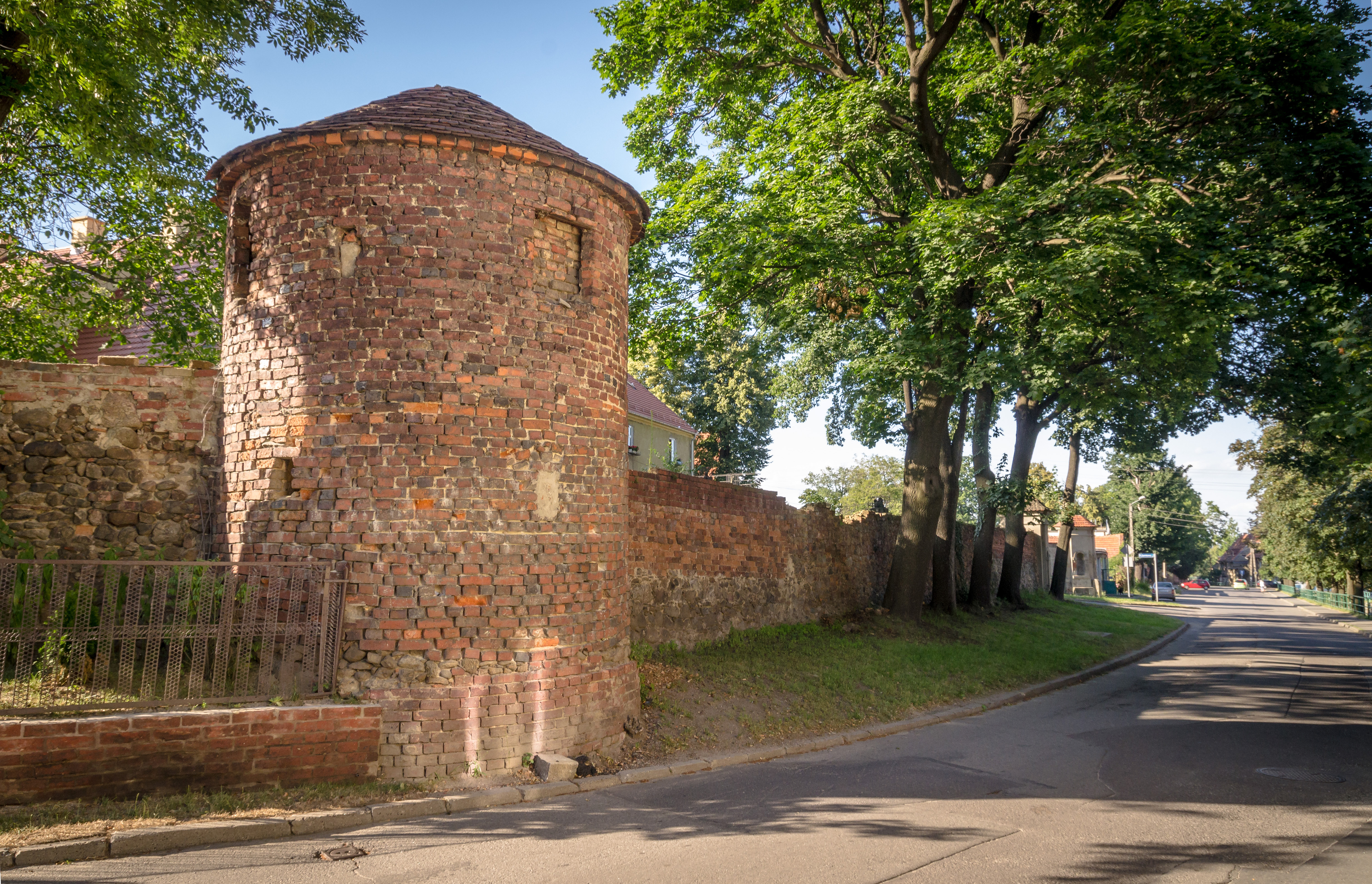
Defensive walls of Pieszyce Castle

The Waldhufendorf settlement in the Duchy of Silesia, one of the duchies of fragmented Poland, was first mentioned in a 1250 deed. The first church was built in the 13th century. In 1291 it fell with the lands of Świdnica to the Silesian Duchy of Jawor, which upon the death of Duke Bolko II the Small in 1368 was ruled by the Kings of Bohemia.

From the 16th century onwards, Pieszyce (Peterswaldau) developed as a centre of weaving. The Lords of Perswaldau had a castle erected in 1617, which was rebuilt in a Baroque style in 1710. The Polish-Saxon cabinet minister Erdmann II of Promnitz acquired the estates in 1721 and gained the privilege to fabricate woven goods by Emperor Charles VI.

With most of Silesia, Peterswaldau was annexed from Habsburg-ruled Bohemia by Prussia after the First Silesian War in 1742. In 1765 the lordship passed to Count Christian Frederick of Stolberg-Wernigerode, whose descendants held the estates until their expulsion in 1945. The Silesian weavers' uprising of 1844 took place in the town, and was brutally crushed by Prussian troops. The social hardship of the population in the course of the 19th century industrialisation was perpetuated by the famous Silesian author Gerhart Hauptmann in his play The Weavers, which is set in Peterswaldau. From 1871 the village was part of Germany. During World War II, Nazi Germans operated a women's subcamp of the Gross-Rosen concentration camp in the town.

In 1945, after Nazi Germany's defeat in the war, the town became again part of Poland.

In June/July 1945, a local Jewish committee formed and more and more Jews arrived in the town, in the context of a repatriation agreement with the Soviet Union. Social institutions such as a crib, kindergarten, a school, and a theater were created here for the Jewish population. In general, Polish-Jewish relations were good and the town became famous for the country's largest Jewish-run cooperative. However, from 1946 on, the Jewish population began departing for Palestine. The last traces of Jewish life disappeared in the wake of the antisemitic propaganda during the 1968 Polish political crisis.

Pieszyce was granted town rights in 1962 and, from 1975 to 1998, was administratively part of the Wałbrzych Voivodeship.

== Sights ==
The most significant historic landmarks of the town are:

- Pieszyce Castle complex
- Saint James church
- Saint Anthony church
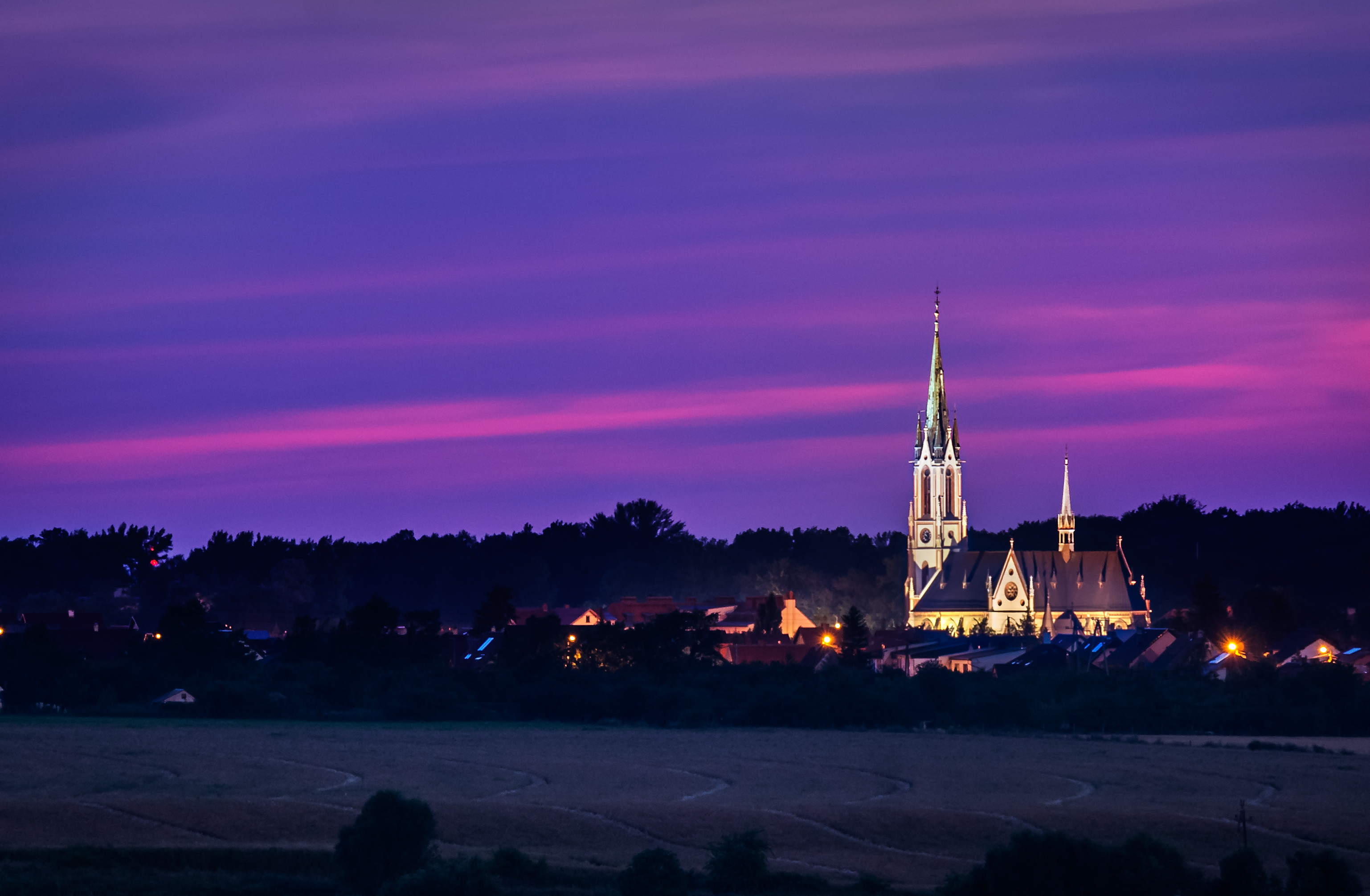
Panorama of Pieszyce with the church of St. Anthony

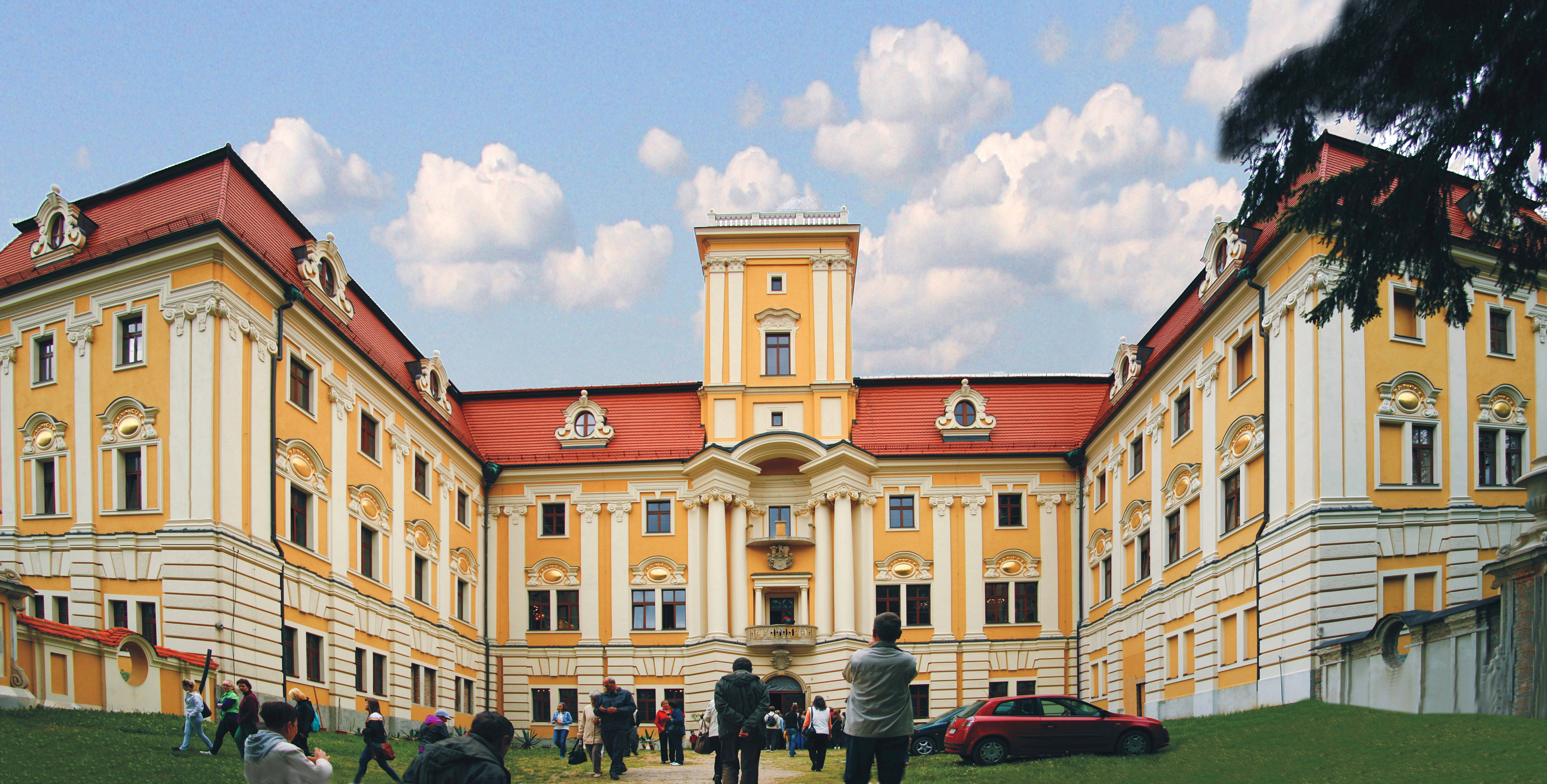
Pieszyce Castle

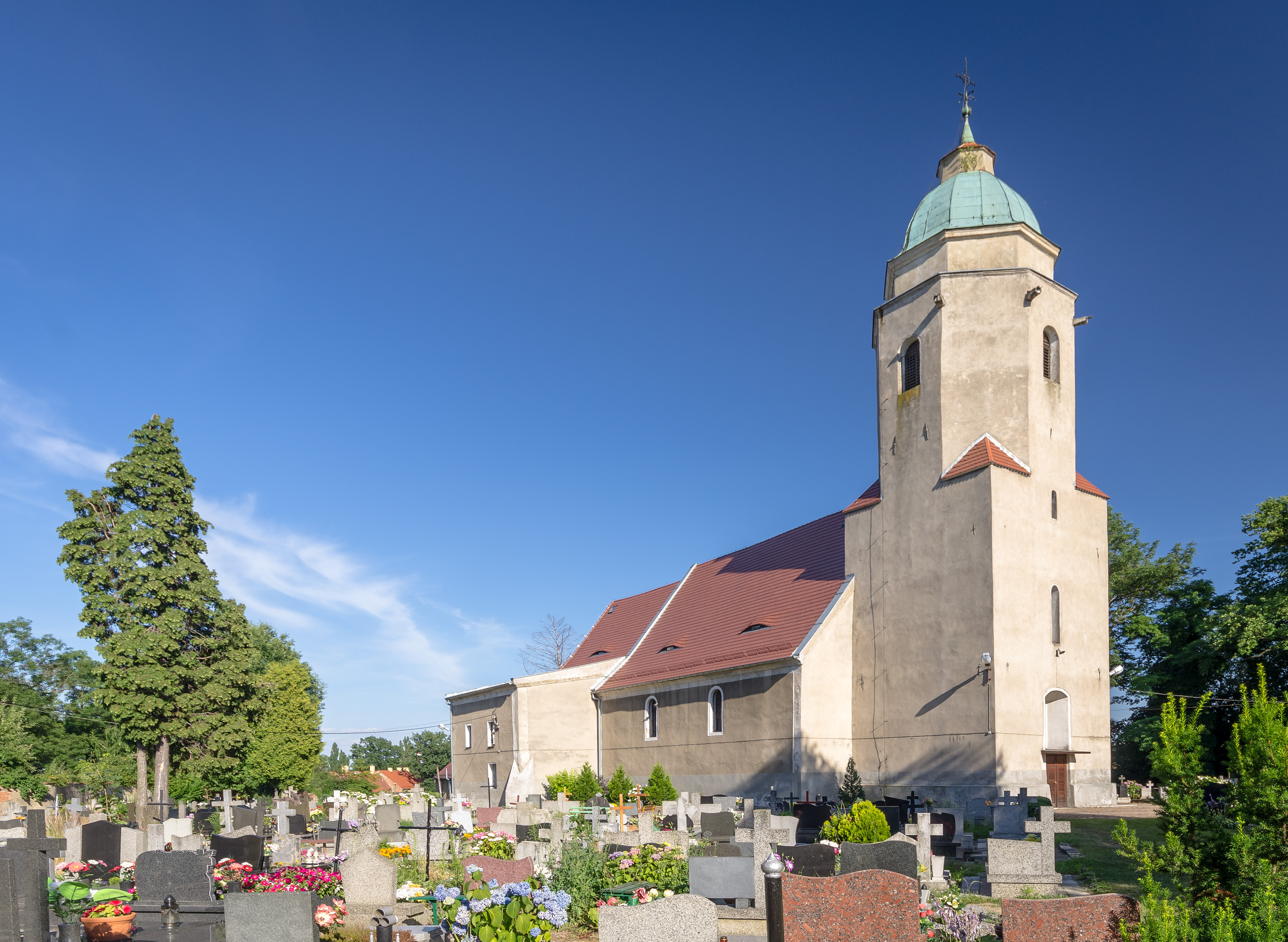
Saint James church

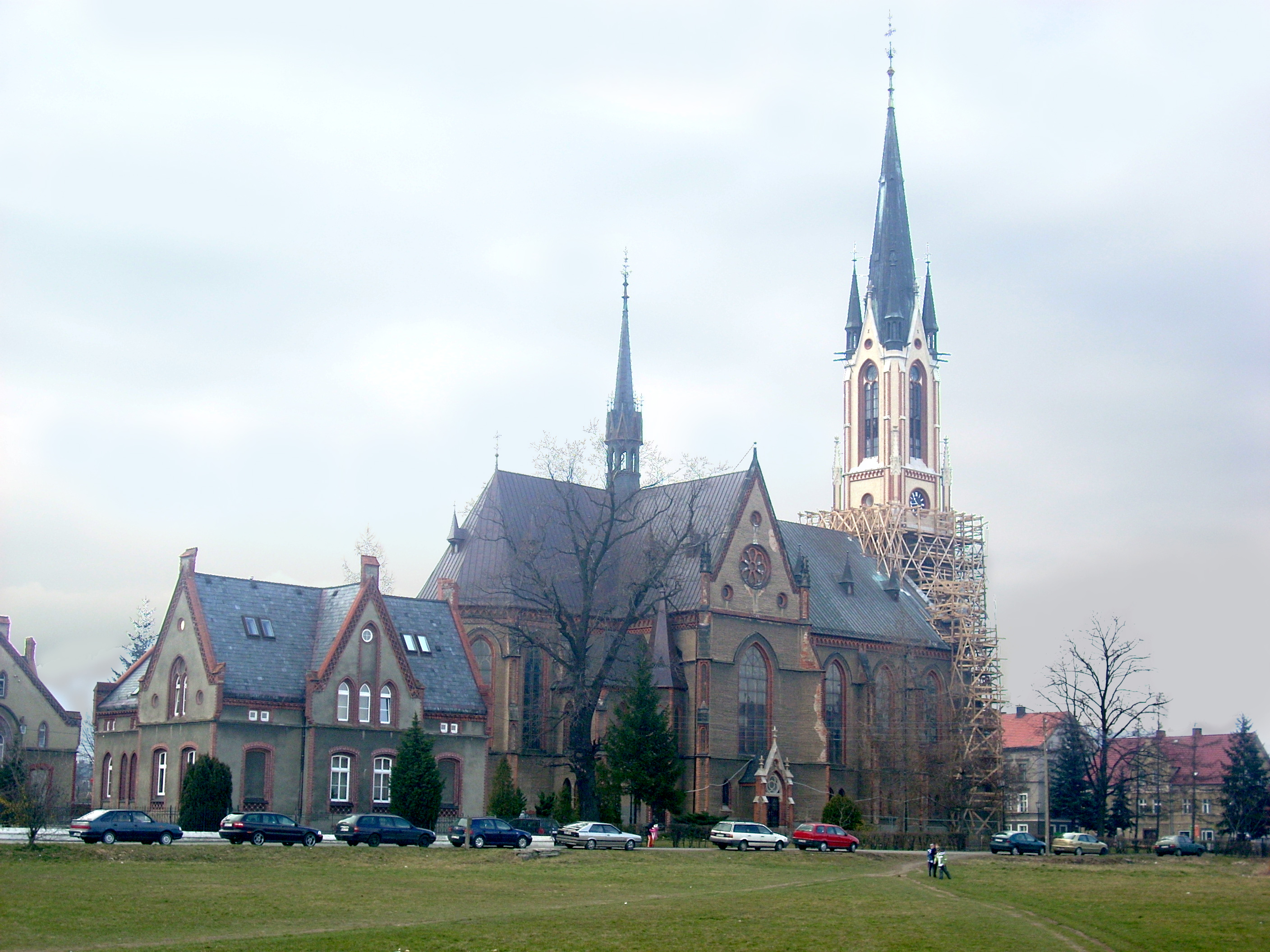
Saint Anthony church

== Sports ==
The local football club is Pogoń Pieszyce. It competes in the lower leagues.

== Notable people ==
- Anna of Stolberg-Wernigerode (1819–1868), deaconess and matron of the Bethanien hospital in Berlin

== Twin towns – sister cities ==
See twin towns of Gmina Pieszyce.
