= Dzierżoniów =

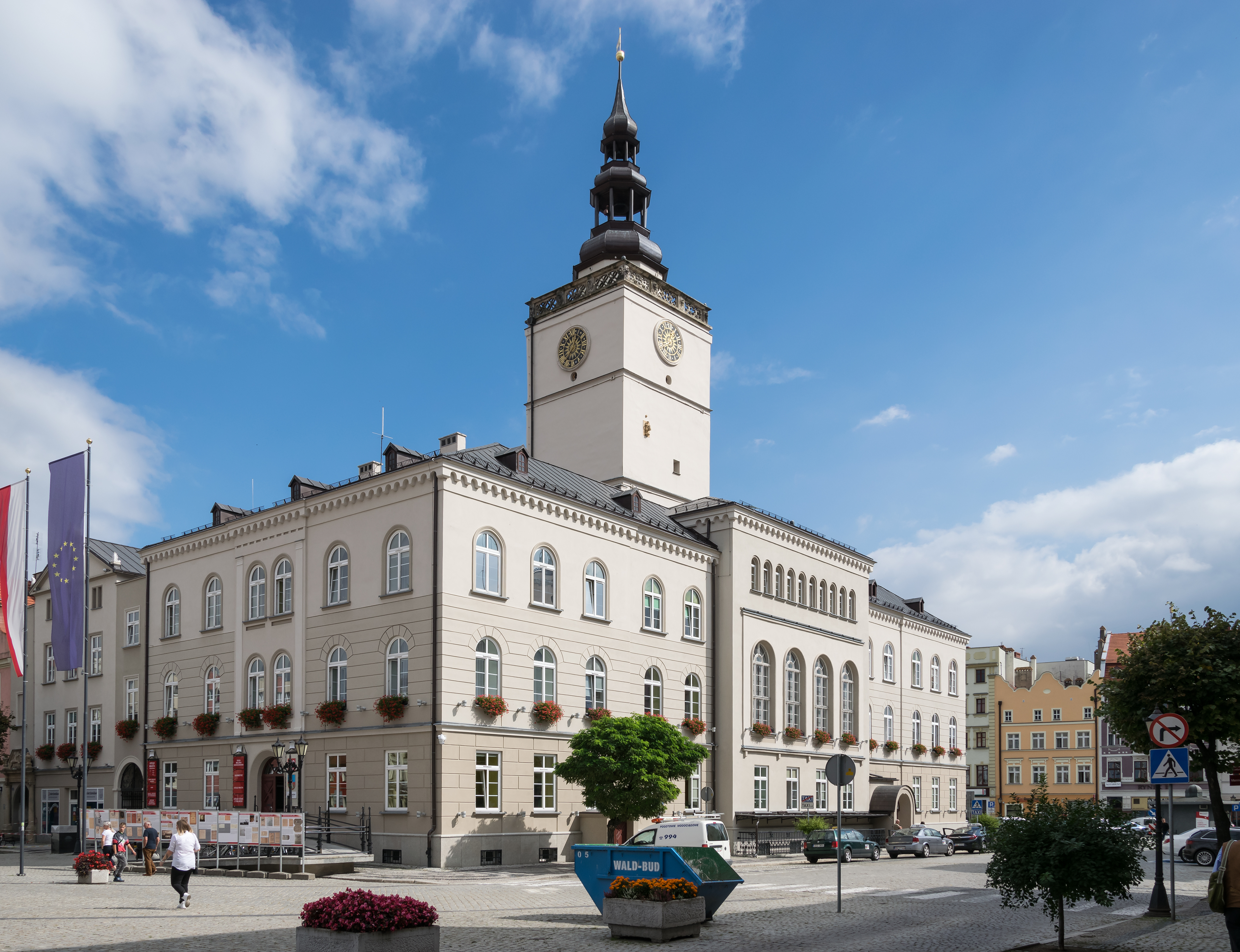
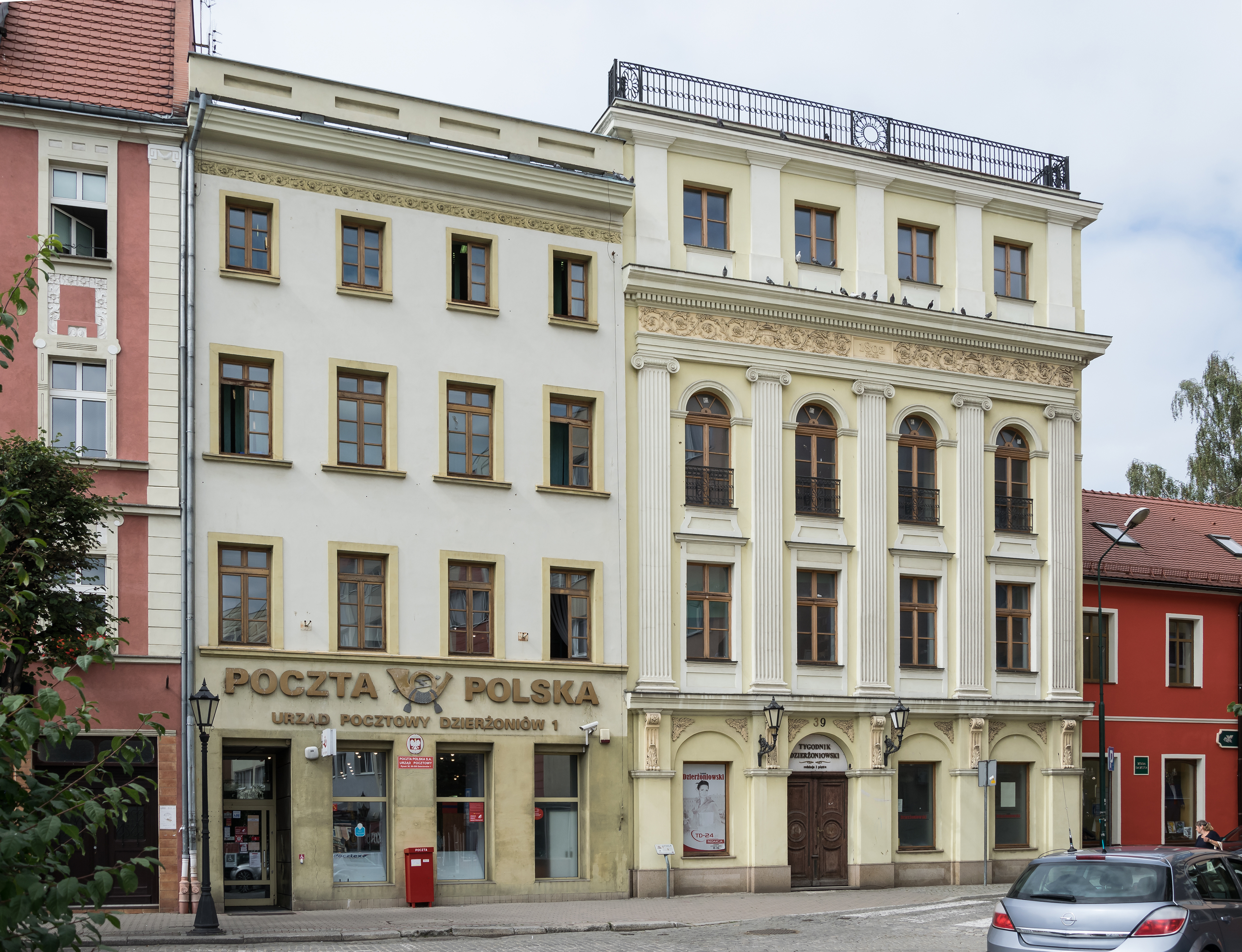
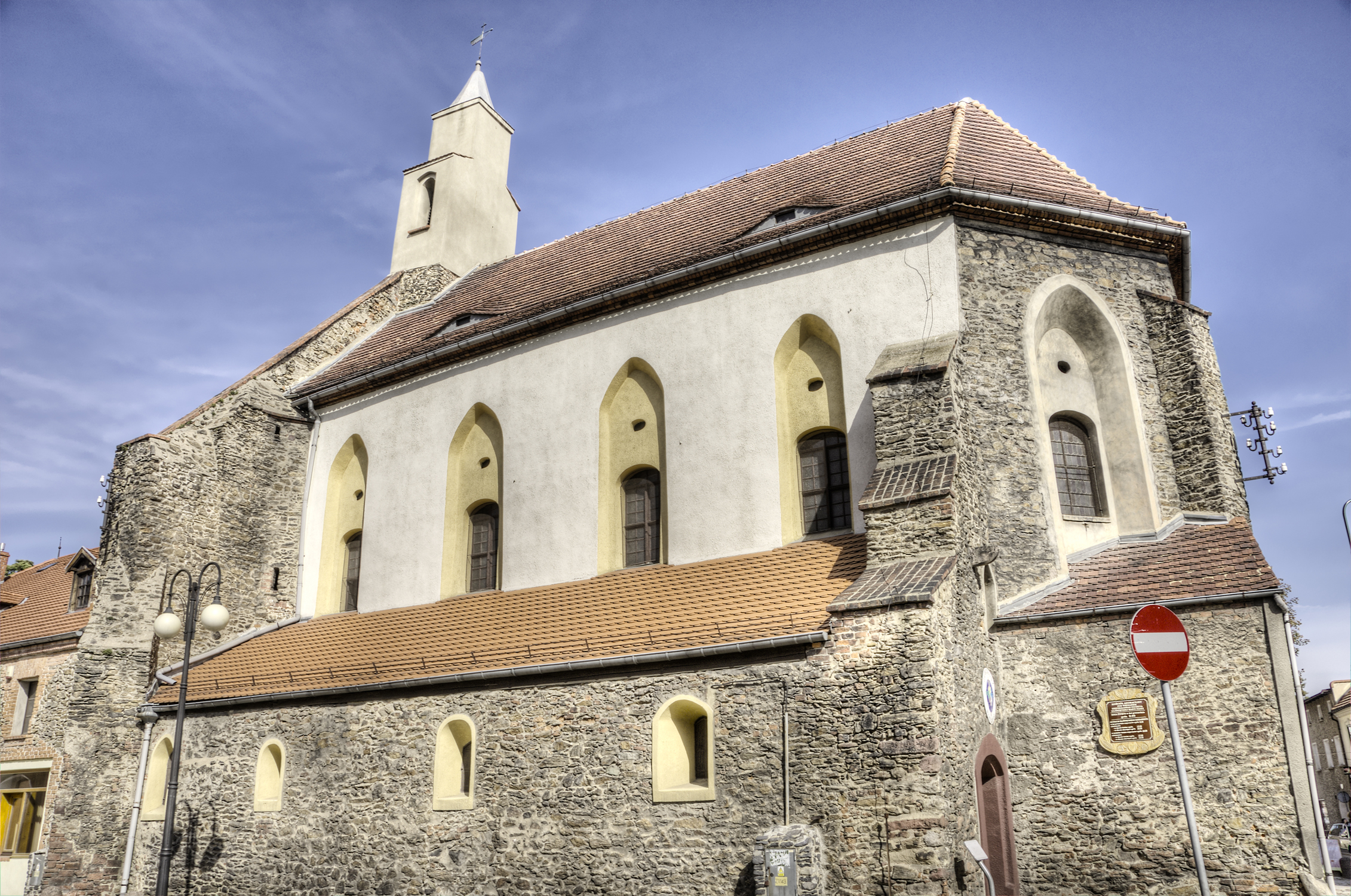
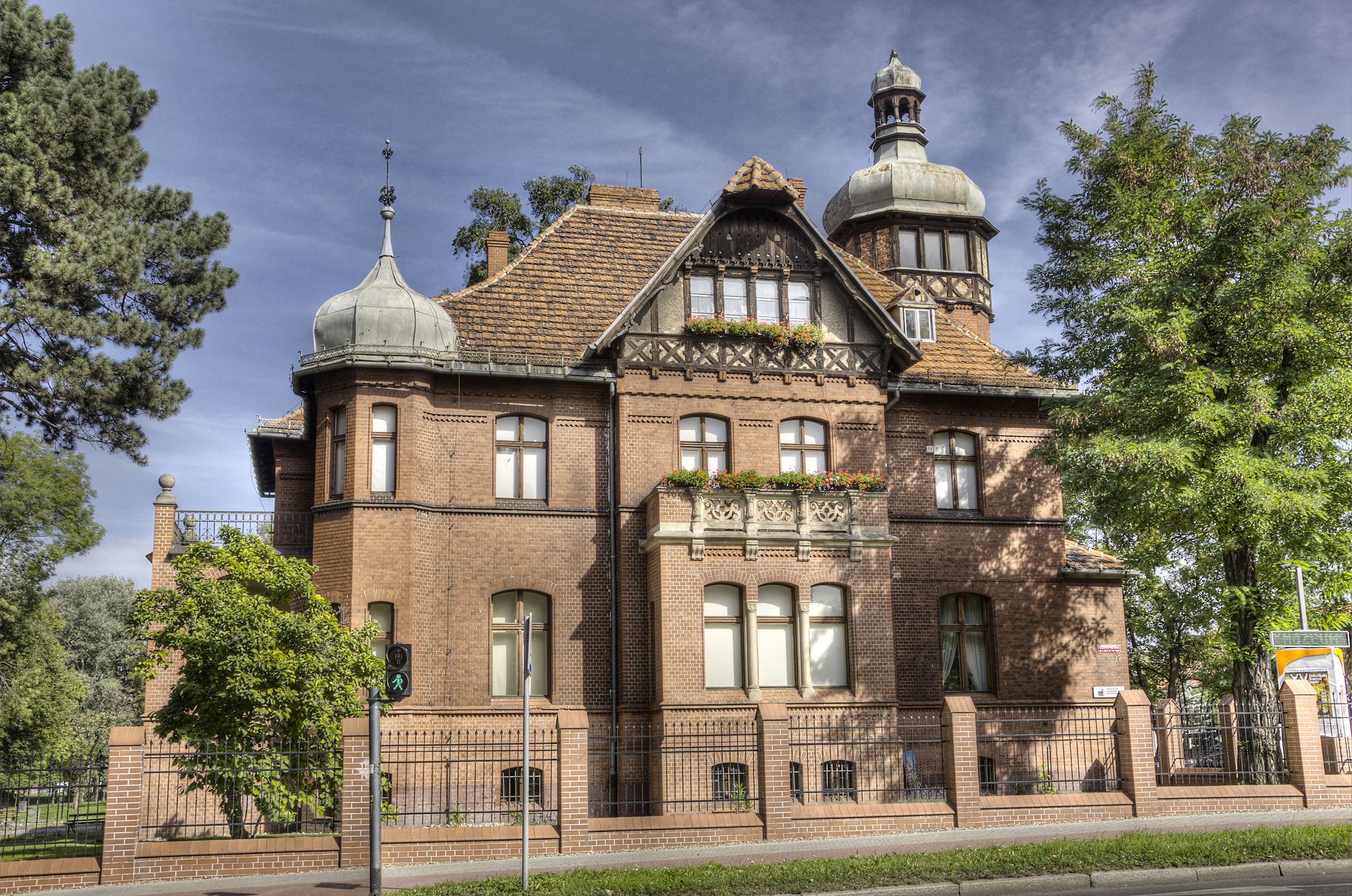
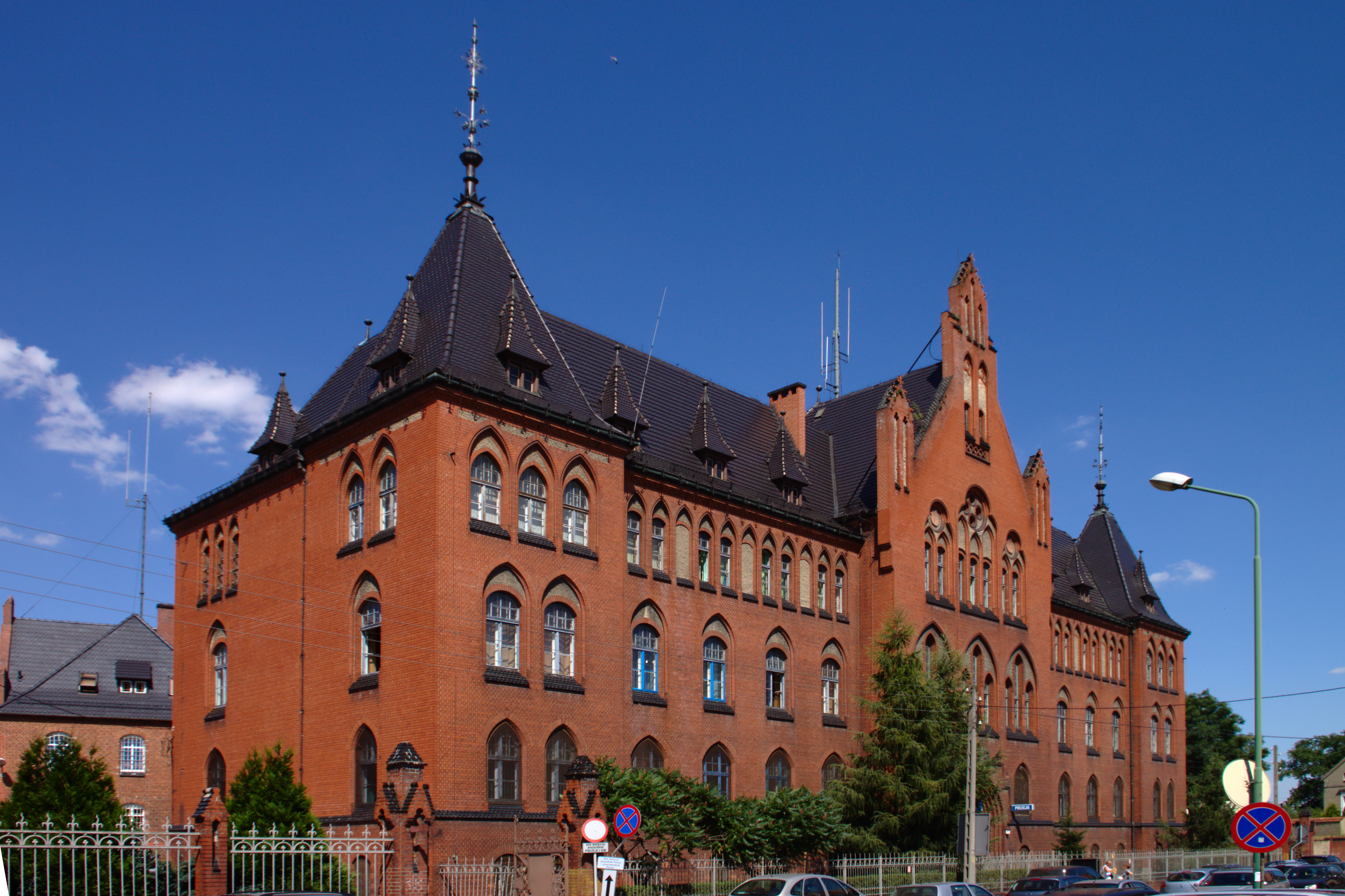
- From top, left to right: Town Hall; Market Square; Church of Immaculate Conception; Municipal Museum of Dzierżoniów; Police station

- Flag Coat of arms

- Location within Poland
- Coordinates: 50°43′41″N 16°39′04″E
- Country: Poland
- Voivodeship: Lower Silesian
- County: Dzierżoniów
- Gmina: Dzierżoniów (urban gmina)
- Established: 13th century
- Town rights: before 1290

Government
  - Mayor: Dariusz Kucharski

Area
  - Total: 20.07 km^{2} (7.75 sq mi)
- Elevation: 261 m (856 ft)

Population (31 December 2021)
  - Total: 32,346
  - Density: 1,612/km^{2} (4,174/sq mi)
- Time zone: UTC+1 (CET)
  - Summer (DST): UTC+2 (CEST)
- Postal code: 58-200 to 58-205
- Area code: +48 74
- Vehicle registration: DDZ
- Website: https://dzierzoniow.pl/

Dzierżoniów (Polish: [d͡ʑɛrˈʐɔɲuf]; until 1946 Polish: Rychbach; German: Reichenbach im Eulengebirge [ˈʁaɪçn̩bax]) is a town located at the foot of the Owl Mountains in southwestern Poland, within the Lower Silesian Voivodeship. It is the seat of Dzierżoniów County, and of Gmina Dzierżoniów (although it is not part of the territory of the latter, since the town forms a separate urban gmina).

Established in the 13th century, Dzierżoniów is a historical Lower Silesian town that covers an area of 20.1 square kilometres (7.8 sq mi), and as of December 2021 it has a population of 32,346. It is named after Polish priest and scientist Jan Dzierżon.

Unique and architecturally rich, Dzierżoniów features a central market square with elegant tenements and a town hall as well as few museums and restaurants. The Old Town is a venue for several annual events and fairs.

== History ==
In its early history until 1945, the town was known as Reichenbach; composed of the German words reich (rich, strong) and Bach (stream), it refers to the current of the Piława River. The name was rendered in Polish as Rychbach. To differentiate between other places named Reichenbach, the Lower Silesian town became known in German as Reichenbach im Eulengebirge, or "Reichenbach in the Owl Mountains".

=== Middle Ages ===
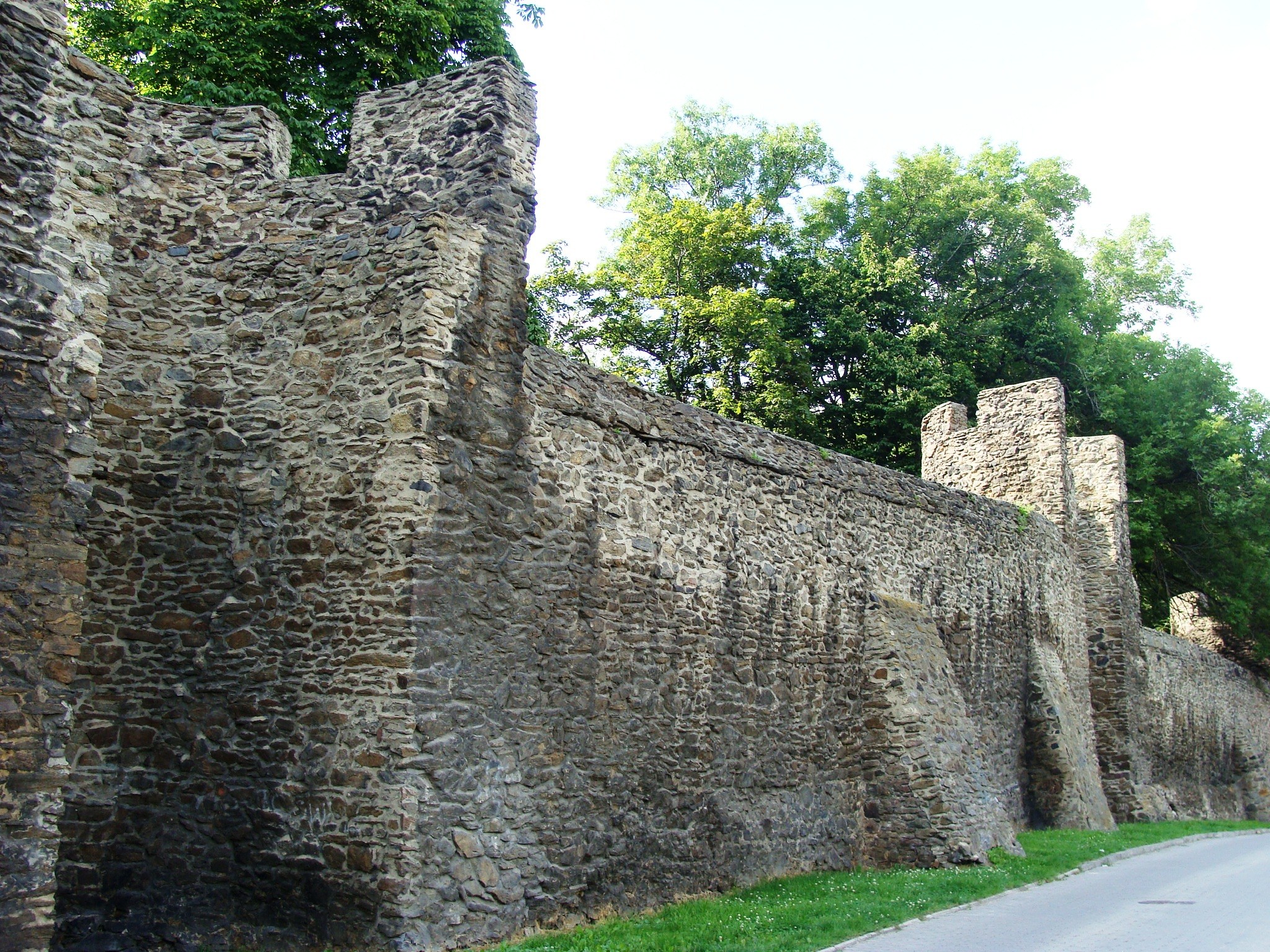
Medieval town walls

In the early Middle Ages, the area was inhabited by the tribe of Silesians. After short periods of Great Moravian and Czech rule, in the 10th century the region became part of the emerging Polish state.

Reichenbach was first mentioned in a document dating to 13 February 1258. The parish Church of St. George was also noted early on. The town was part of various Piast-ruled duchies of fragmented Poland. The coat of arms, depicting Saint George slaying a dragon, was used by 1290 at the latest. The town passed successively from the Bishopric of Wrocław, to the Duchy of Ziębice, and to the Duchy of Świdnica-Jawor. The Knights Hospitaller built a school and hospital in the town in 1338. In 1392 the town became part of the Kingdom of Bohemia. It was plundered by the Hussites during the 15th-century Hussite Wars.

=== Early modern era ===
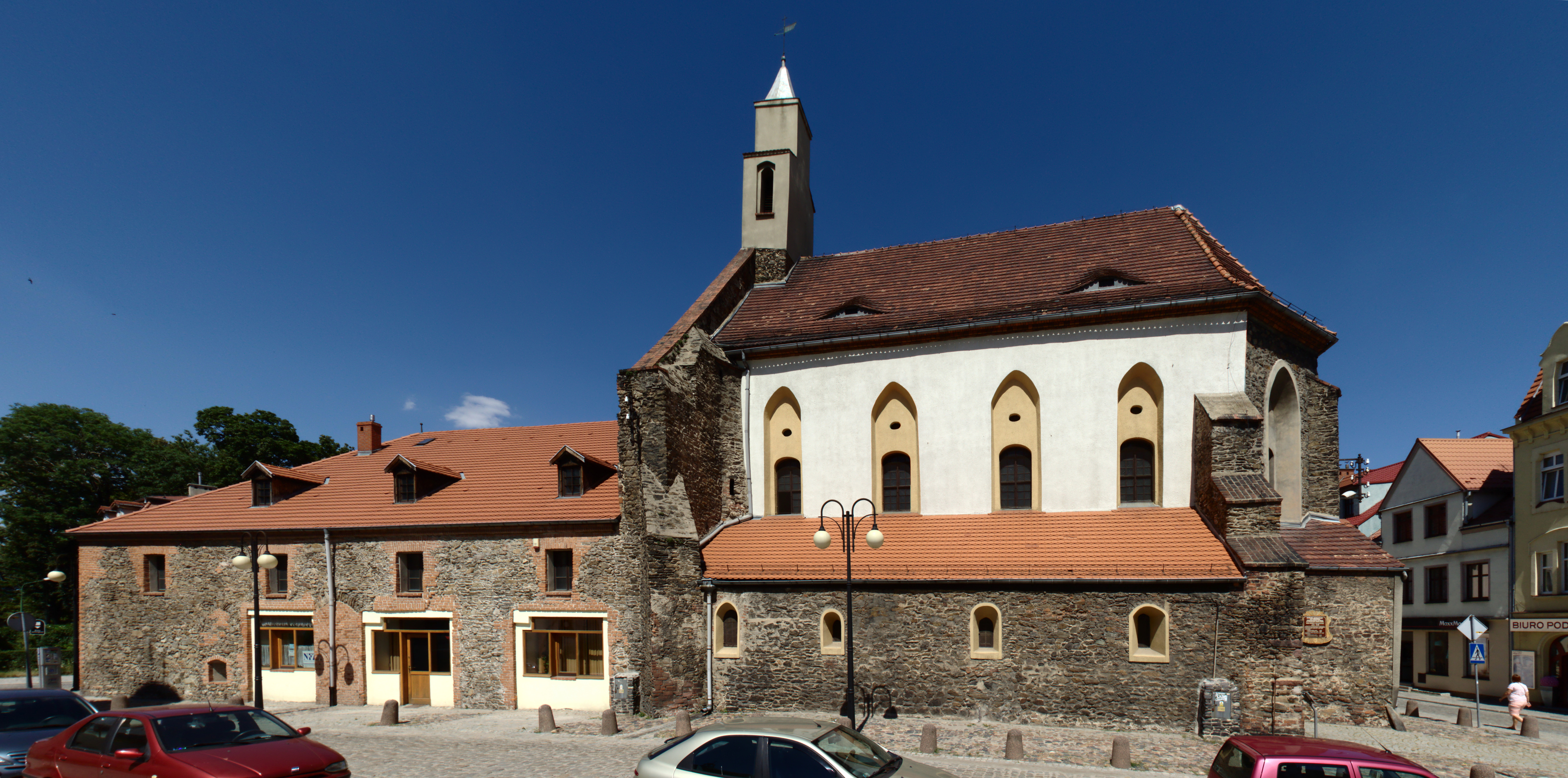
Church of Immaculate Conception and the former Augustinian monastery

The Habsburg monarchy of Austria inherited the Bohemian throne in 1526 and became the town's new lords. Reichenbach developed into a trading center, especially for textiles and linen, during the 16th century. In 1606, some 2,000 people died during an epidemic. The town suffered during the Thirty Years' War (1618–1648), and was plundered by Swedish and Imperial troops in 1633 and 1634, respectively.

After the First Silesian War in 1742, most of Silesia, including Reichenbach, became part of the Kingdom of Prussia. In 1762 during the Seven Years' War, the region between Reichenbach and Schweidnitz (Świdnica) was the setting for the Battle of Burkersdorf between Prussia and Austria. It also saw the frustration of an Austrian attempt to relieve the Prussian Siege of Schweidnitz. In 1790 representatives from Austria, Britain, Poland, Prussia and the Dutch Republic met at Reichenbach to discuss the Ottoman wars in Europe. In 1800, the town was visited by future president of the United States John Quincy Adams.

=== 19th and 20th century ===
In 1813, Tsar Alexander I of Russia met with King Frederick William III of Prussia here to organize the War of the Sixth Coalition. From 1816 to 1945 Reichenbach contained the district office for Landkreis Reichenbach (Reichenbach district). Until 1820 the town was the seat of a Prussian district president. In the 19th century, the town became one of the leading centers of textile production in Silesia. In 1848 the Silesian Weavers' Rebellion took place here. Reichenbach was connected to a rail network in 1855. It became part of the Prussian-led German Empire in 1871.

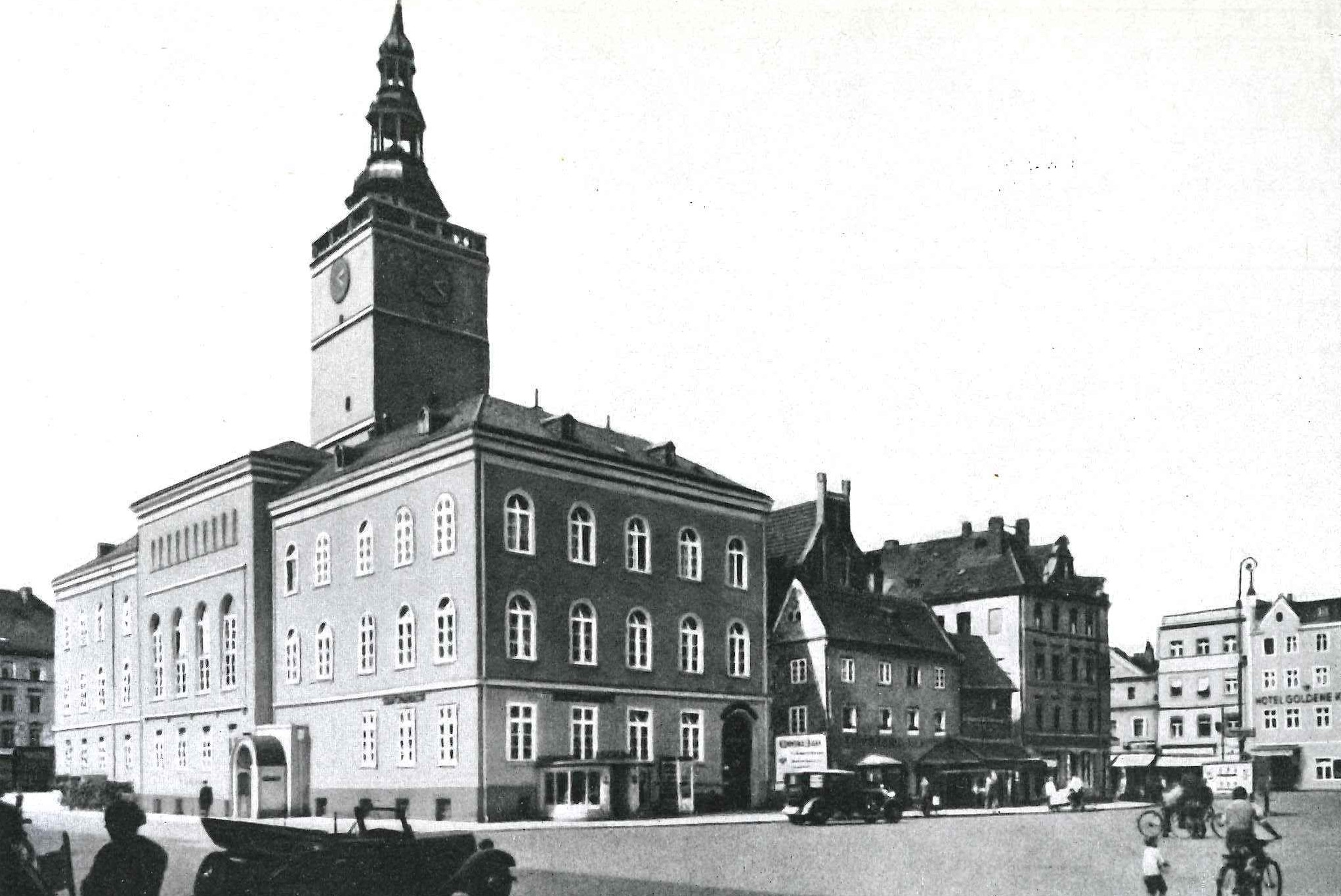
Town hall and Market Square in the 1930s

During World War II, in 1944, the Germans established the FAL Reichenbach subcamp of the Gross-Rosen concentration camp, mainly for Jewish women from the Netherlands. Beside the Rychbach subcamp there were another two in nearby towns. These camps were set up to provide slave labour for German industries where mainly Jewish inmates were worked to death. When the town was liberated by the Red Army on 8 May 1945, about 20,000 Jewish inmates had survived the camp, many of whom were Polish Jews. They did not want to go back to their hometowns because of the decimation of their Jewish communities and the fear of antisemitic violence. They were later joined by Polish Jews repatriated from the Soviet Union, and others who had survived in hiding in Poland or returned from concentration camps in Germany.

At its peak, there were 17,800 Jews in Dzierżoniów in November 1946 of the 50,000-Jew commune in Dzierżoniów County (incl. Bielawa, Pieszyce, Piława Górna, etc.) led by Jakub Egit from 1945 to 1948. One of the town's synagogues survived the war and has been restored.

Reichenbach was transferred from Germany to Poland in 1945 after World War II. Many of its German inhabitants had fled earlier in 1945 before the war's end, while most of those who had stayed were subsequently expelled. The void was filled by Poles moving in, some of whom from the eastern part of the country that had been annexed by the Soviet Union.

In the period immediately following World War II, the town was known by different names. The municipal office, the local office and the railway administration all used different names for it: Rychbach (its traditional Polish name), Reichenbach and Drobniszew. In one of the Polish Ministerial decrees of 1945, another name was used: Rychonek. In 1946 the town was renamed Dzierżoniów after the apiarist Jan Dzierżon; ironically, Germany also viewed Dzierżon as one of their own, and in 1936, as part of a Nazi effort to remove Slavic-sounding place names, his birthplace, Lowkowitz (now Łowkowice), was renamed Bienendorf ("Bee village") in his honor.

The textile and electromechanical industry developed after the war. In 1945, the first radio receiver production company in post-war Poland, Zakłady Radiowe Diora, was founded in Dzierżoniów. Greeks, refugees of the Greek Civil War, settled in Dzierżoniów in the 1950s.

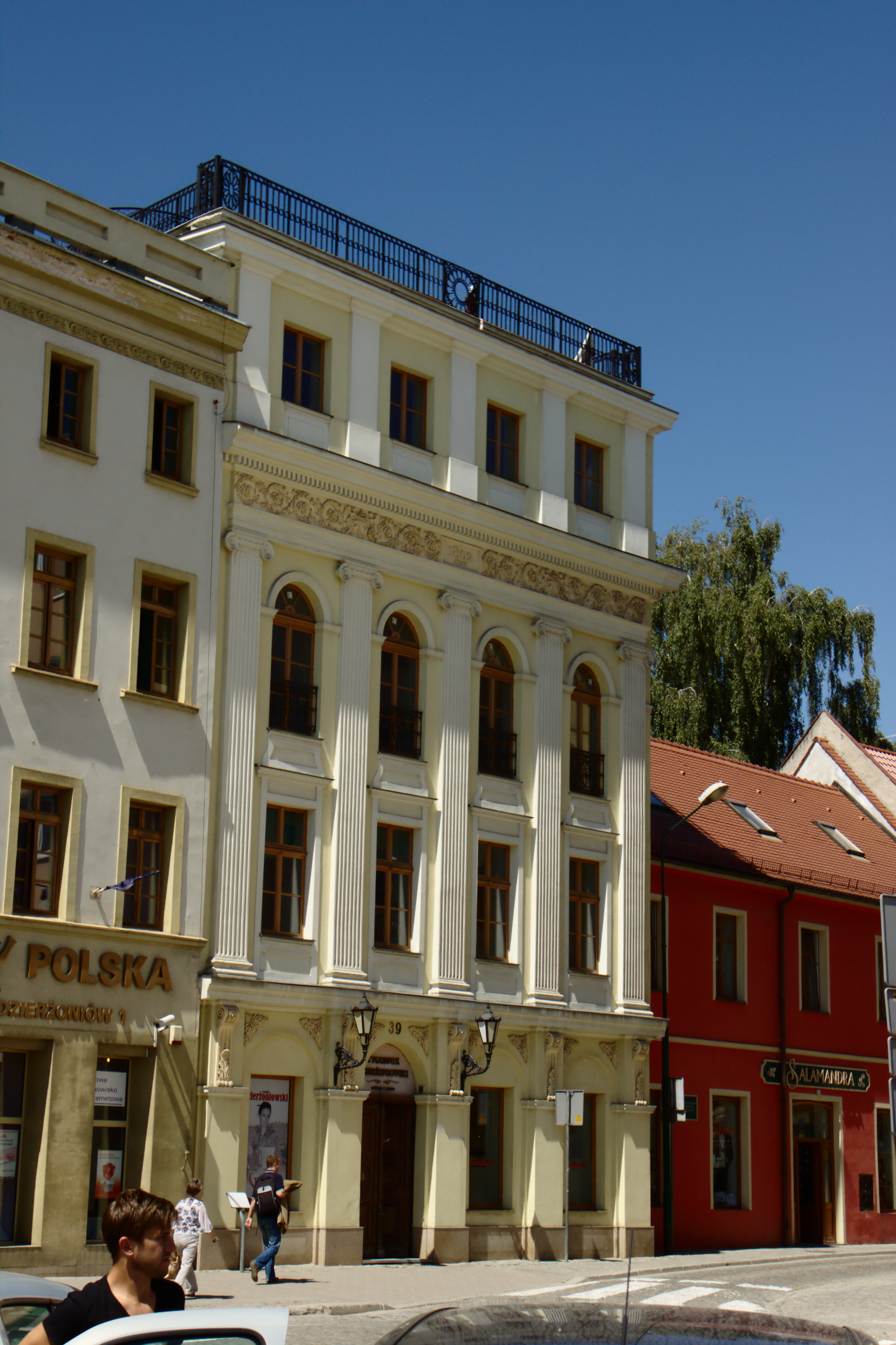
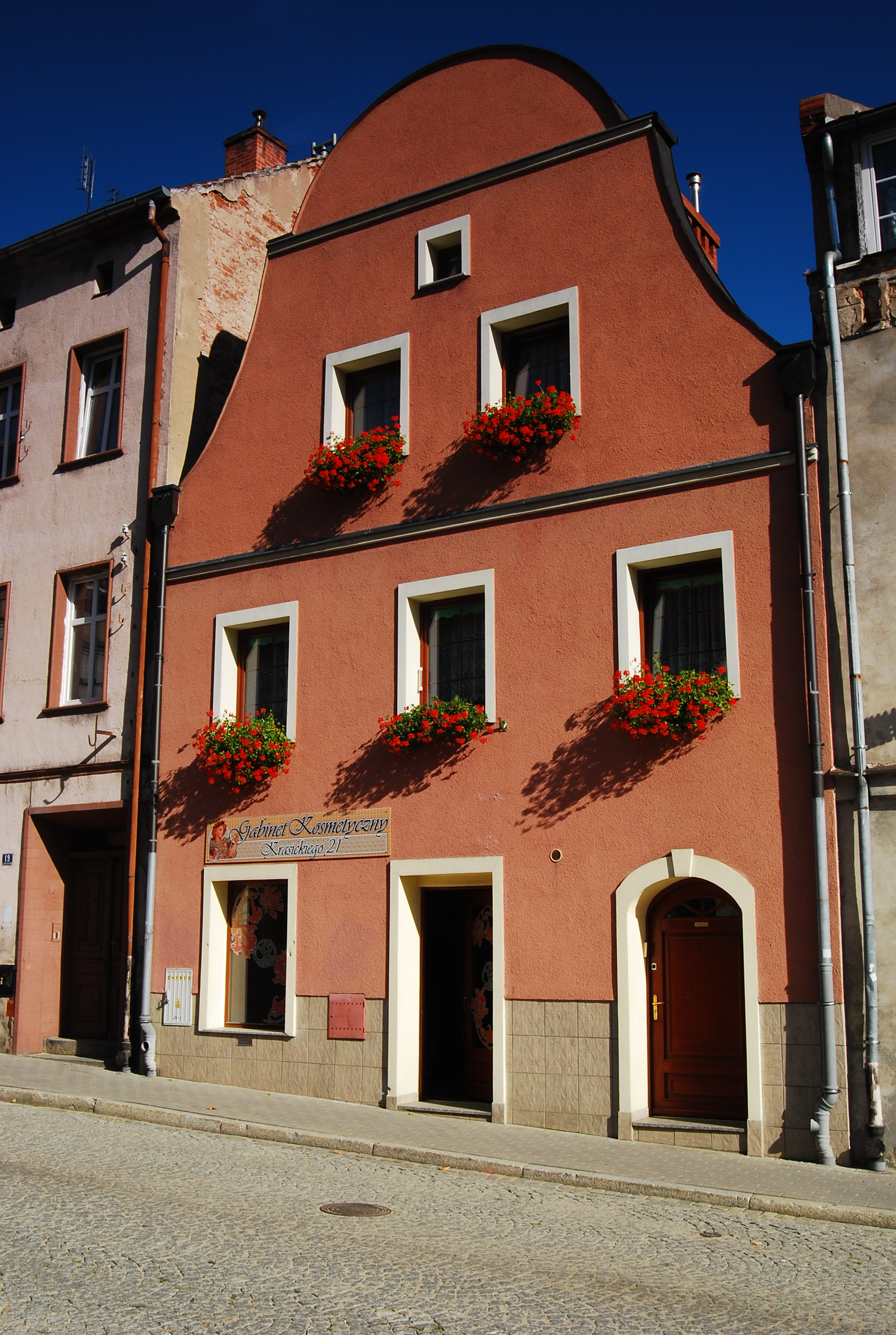
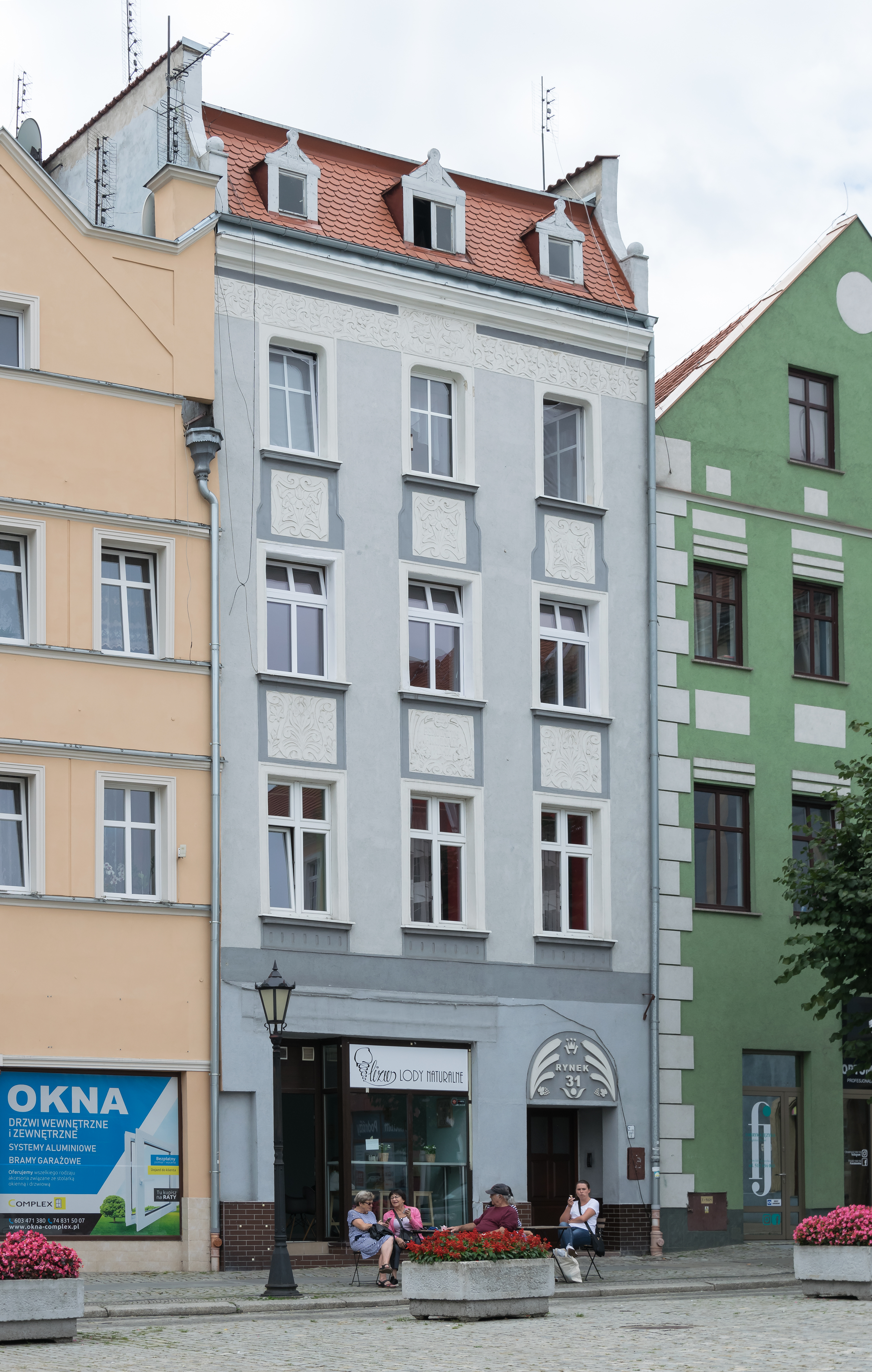
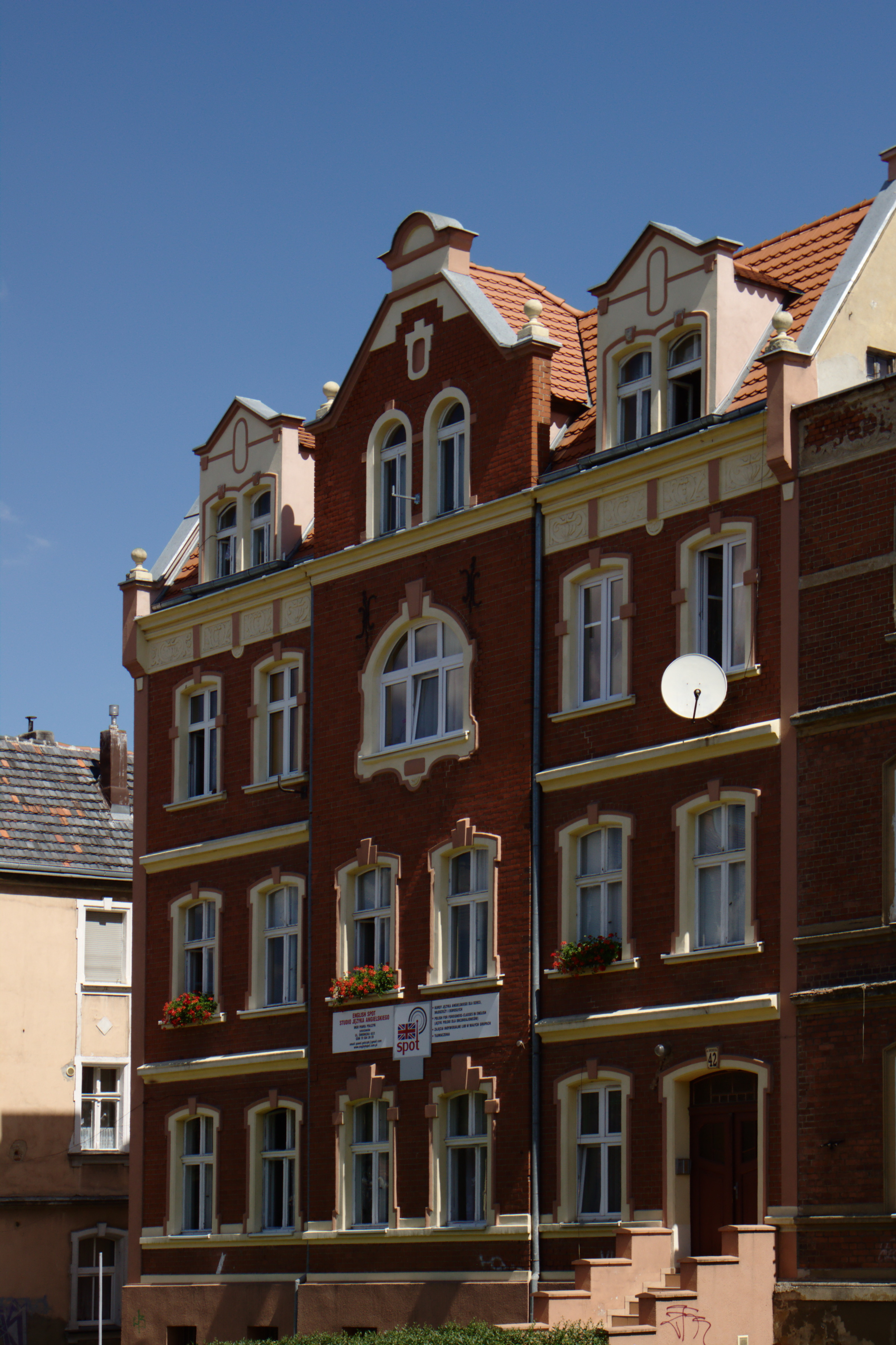
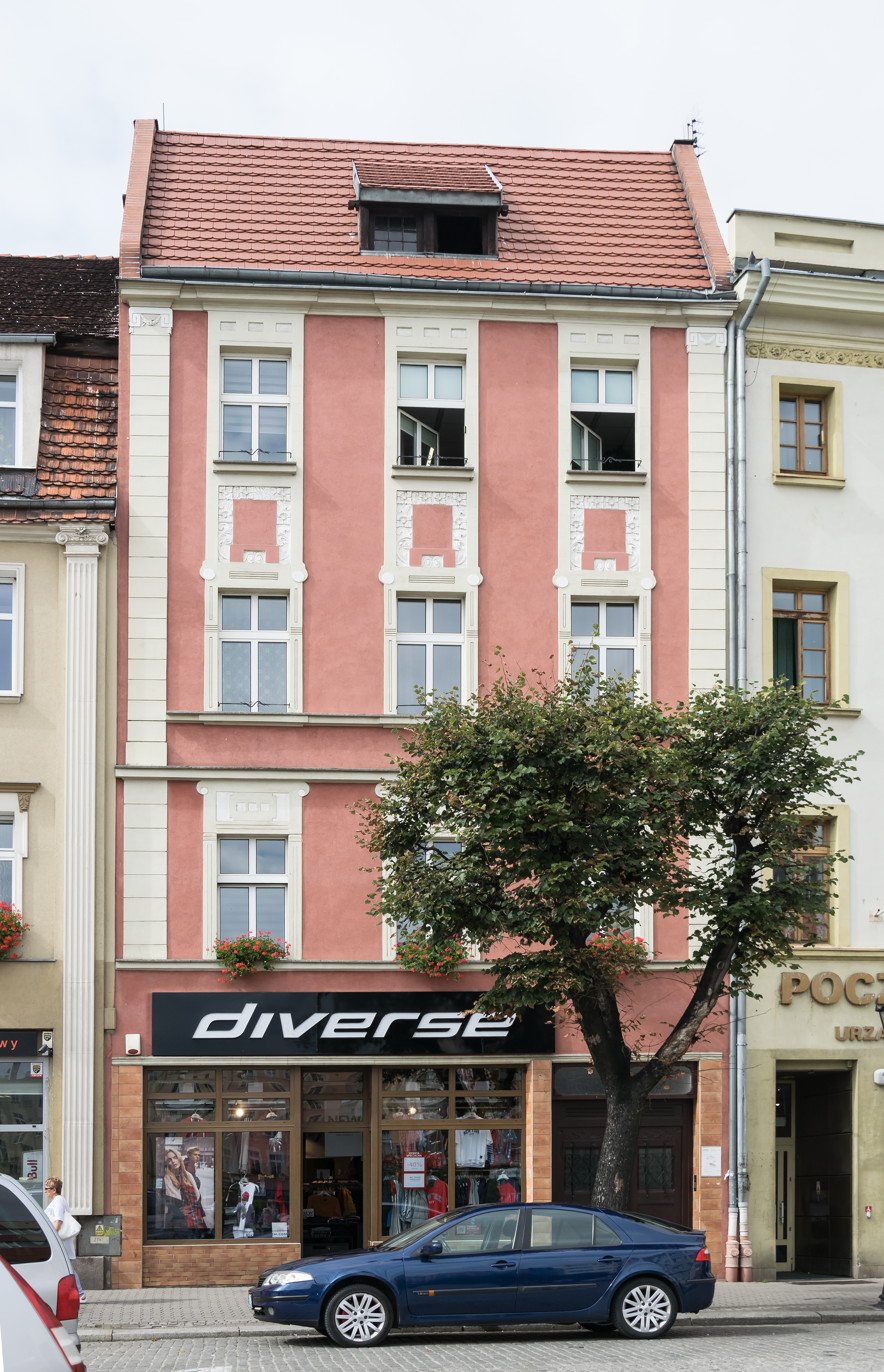
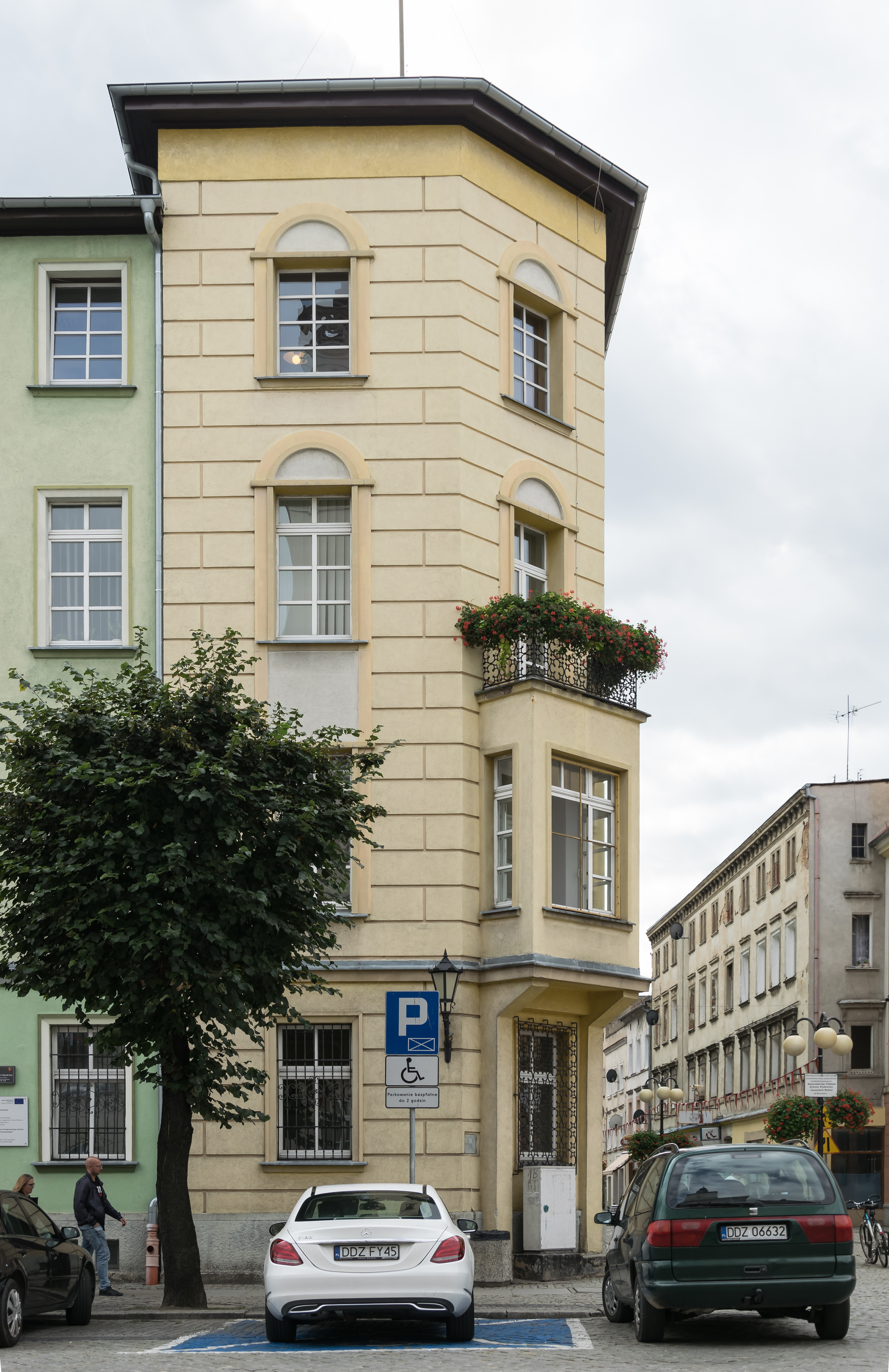
Historic townhouses (examples)

From 1975 to 1998 it was administratively located in the former Wałbrzych Voivodeship.

== Sports ==
Football team Lechia Dzierżoniów and handball team Żagiew Dzierżoniów are based in Dzierżoniów. Football players Krzysztof Piątek, Patryk Klimala, Jarosław Jach, Paweł Sibik all played in Lechia Dzierżoniów in the early stages of their careers, while handball players Paweł Piwko, Jan Czuwara, Dawid Dawydzik played in Żagiew Dzierżoniów in the early stages of their careers.

The annual Tewzadze Open chess tournament is held in Dzierżoniów, to commemorate Georgian-Polish military officer Valerian Tevzadze.

== Notable people ==
- Bianka Blume (1843–1896), German opera singer
- Hans-Jürgen von Arnim (1889–1962), German general
- Valerian Tevzadze (1894–1987), Georgian-Polish military officer
- Herbert Giersch (1921–2010), German economist
- Tzila Dagan (1946–2004), Israeli singer
- Neomy Storch (born 1954), Australian Academic
- Jacek Mickiewicz (born 1970), cyclist
- Piotr Wilczewski (born 1978), boxer
- Paweł Piwko (born 1982), handballer
- Krzysztof Piątek (born 1995), footballer
- Jan Czuwara (born 1995), handballer

Paweł Juraszek (born 1994) Swimmer Joanna Gołebiowska (Born 1982) Swimmer Zuzanna Pisarska (Born 1981) Swimmer

== Twin towns – sister cities ==
Dzierżoniów is twinned with:

- Bischofsheim, Germany (1990)
- Crewe, United Kingdom (2005)
- Hajdúszoboszló, Hungary (2015)
- Kluczbork, Poland (2007)
- Lanškroun, Czech Republic (1999)
- Nantwich, United Kingdom (2005)

== Gallery ==
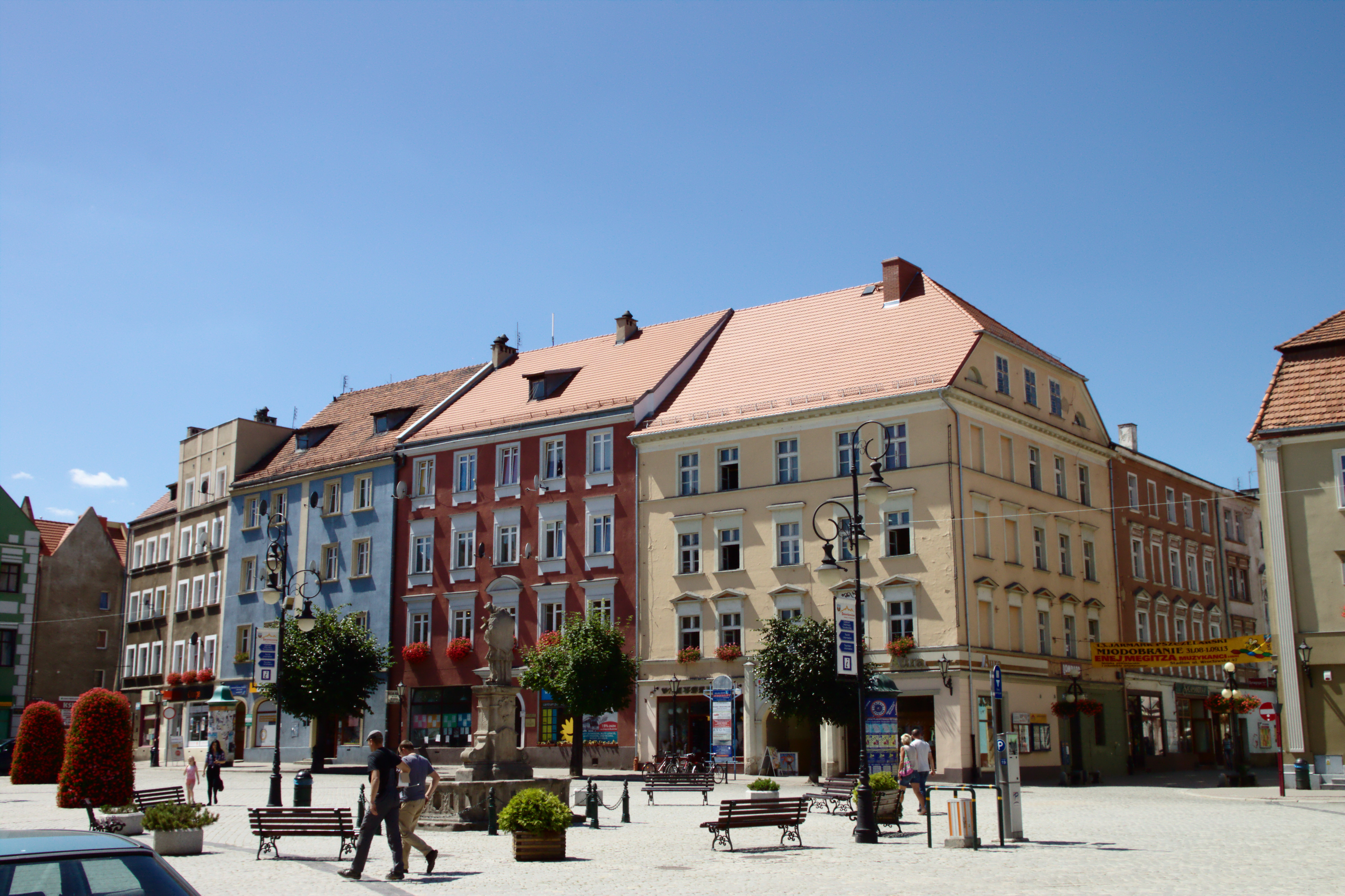
Tenements at the Market Square (Rynek)

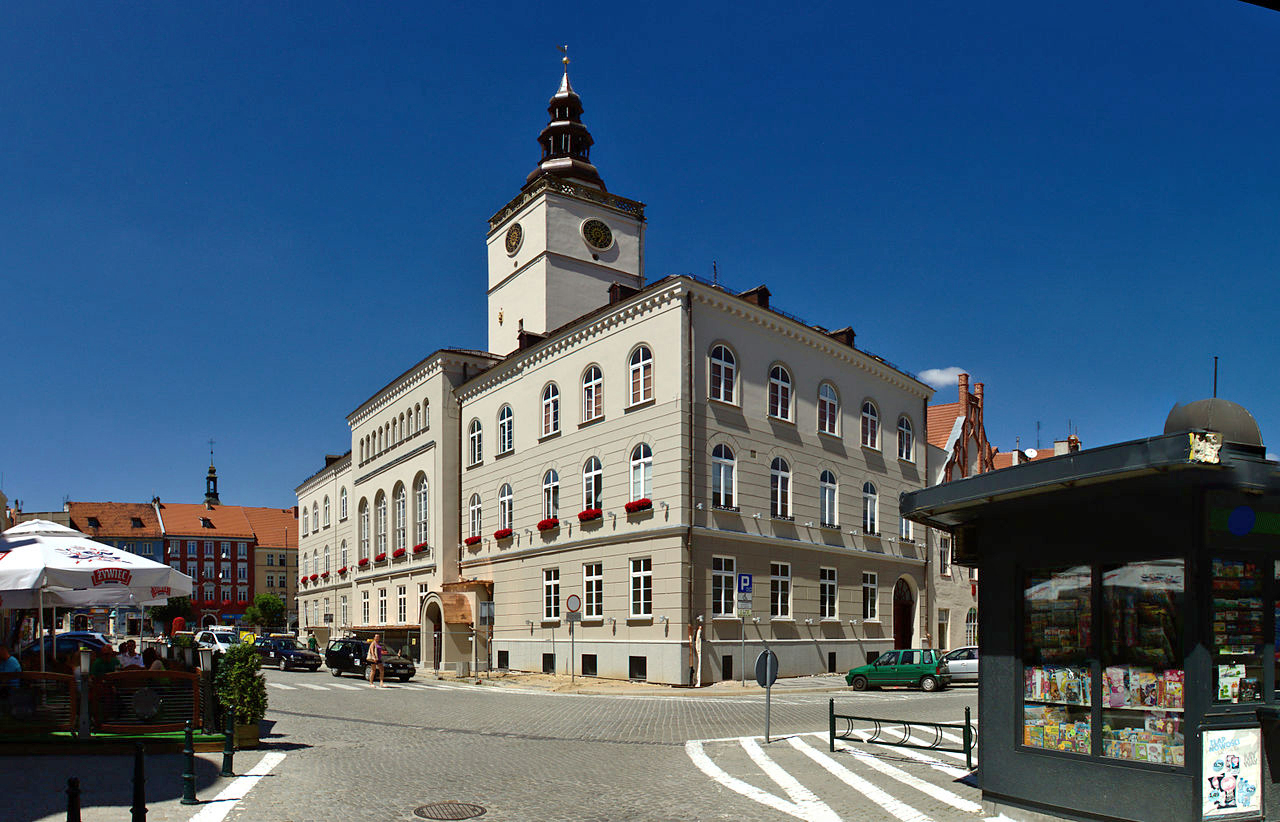
Town Hall (Ratusz)

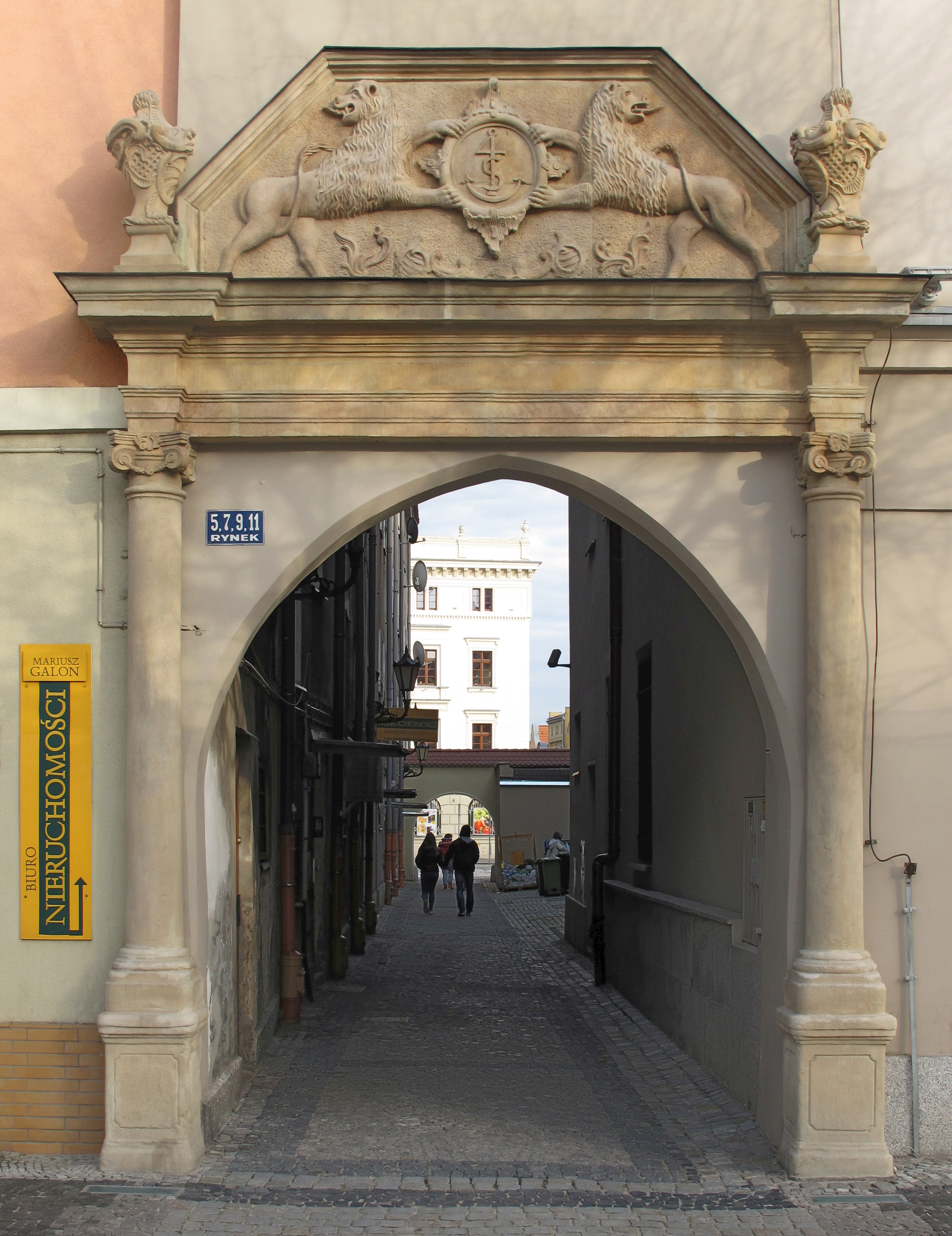
Town Hall

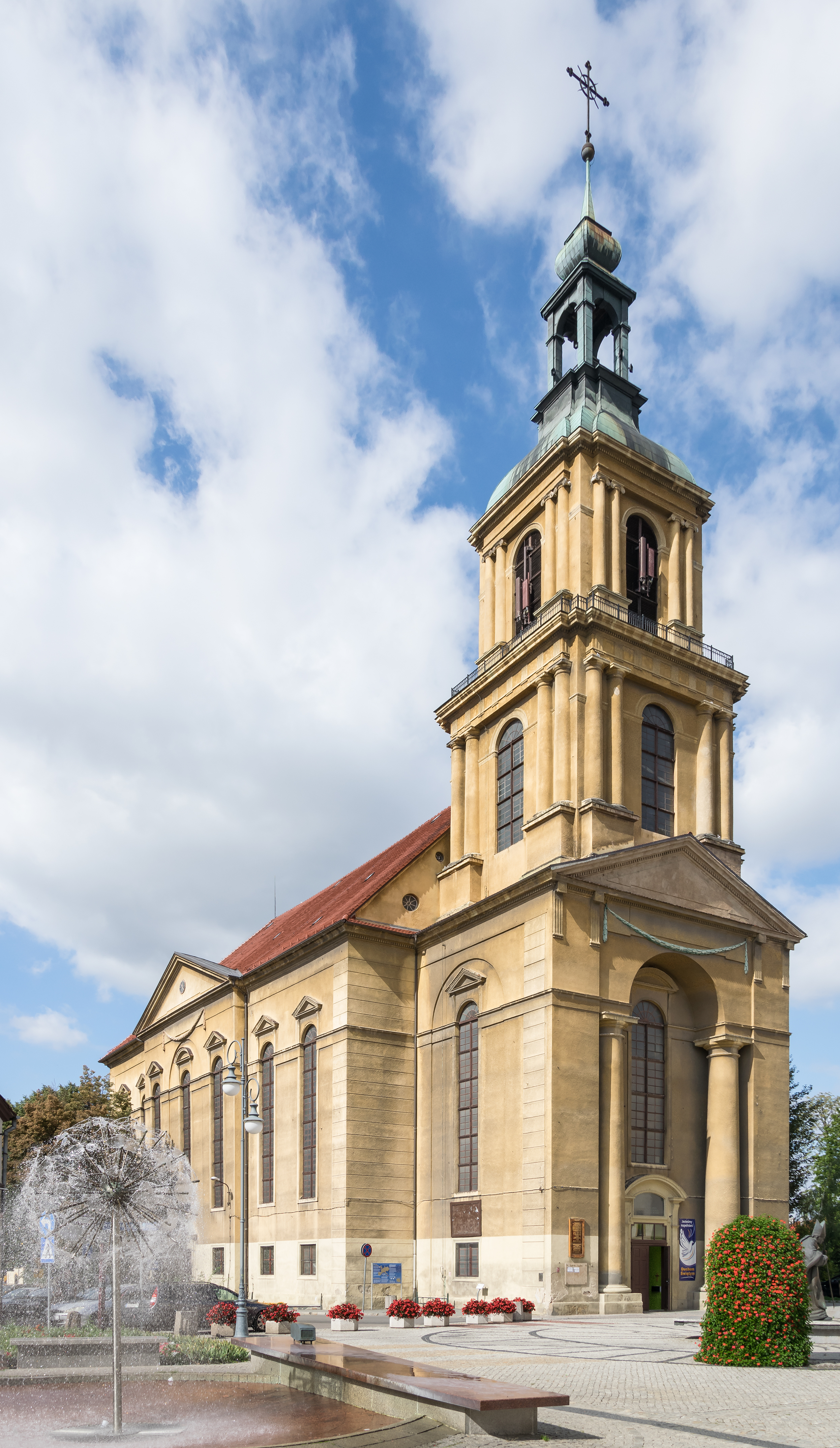
Church of St. Mary the Mother of the Church

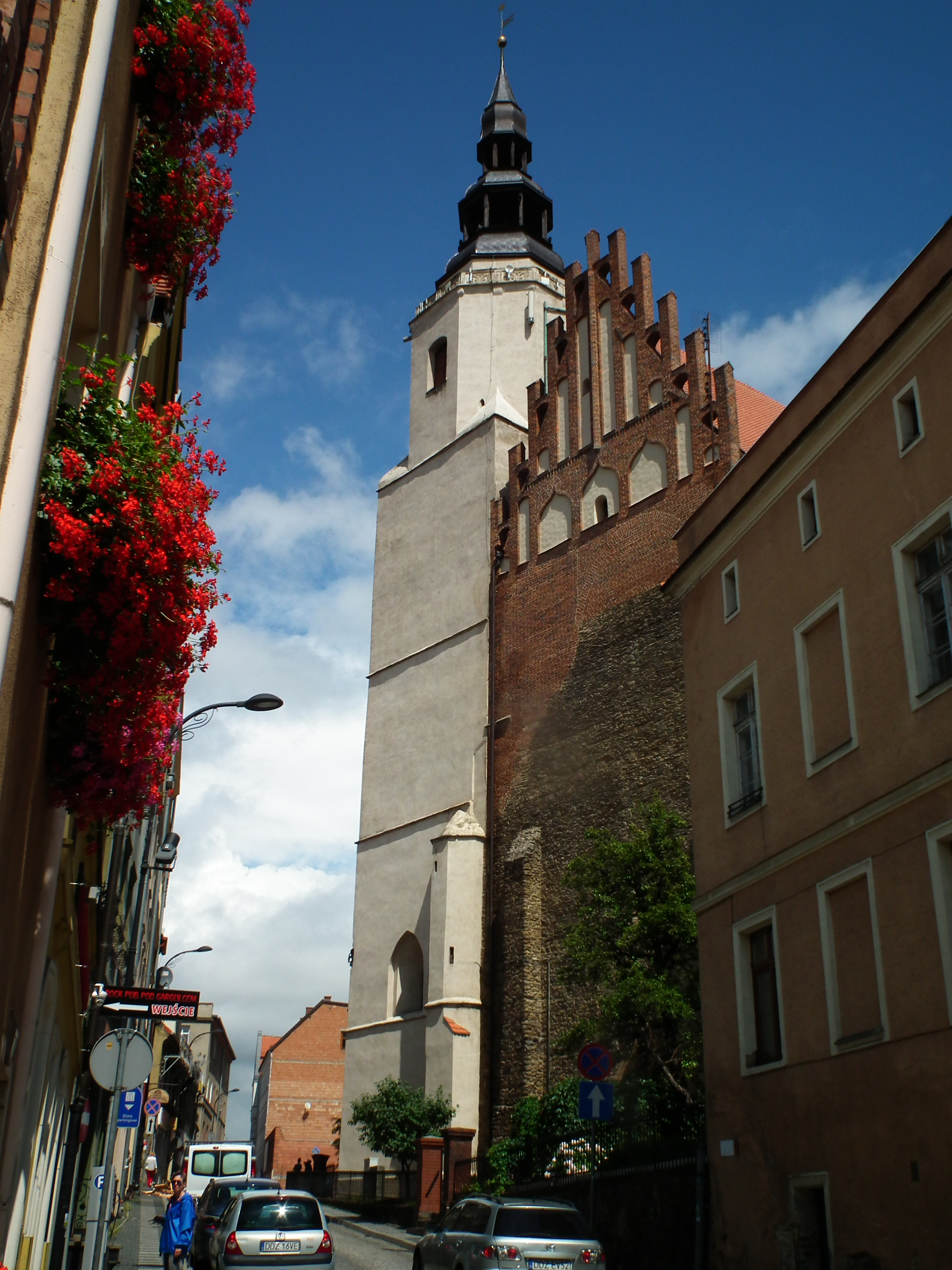
St. George church

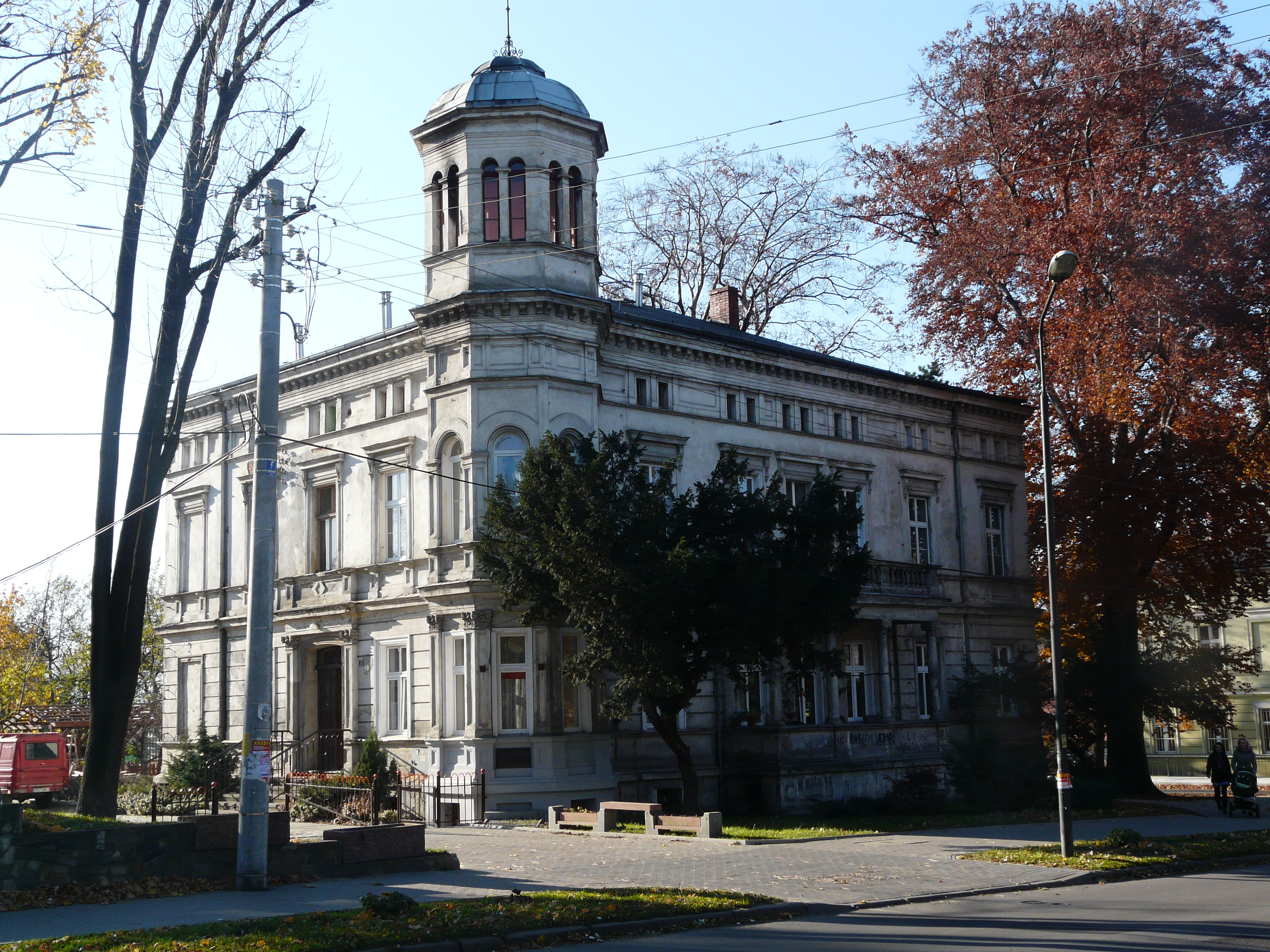
House of Valerian Tevzadze

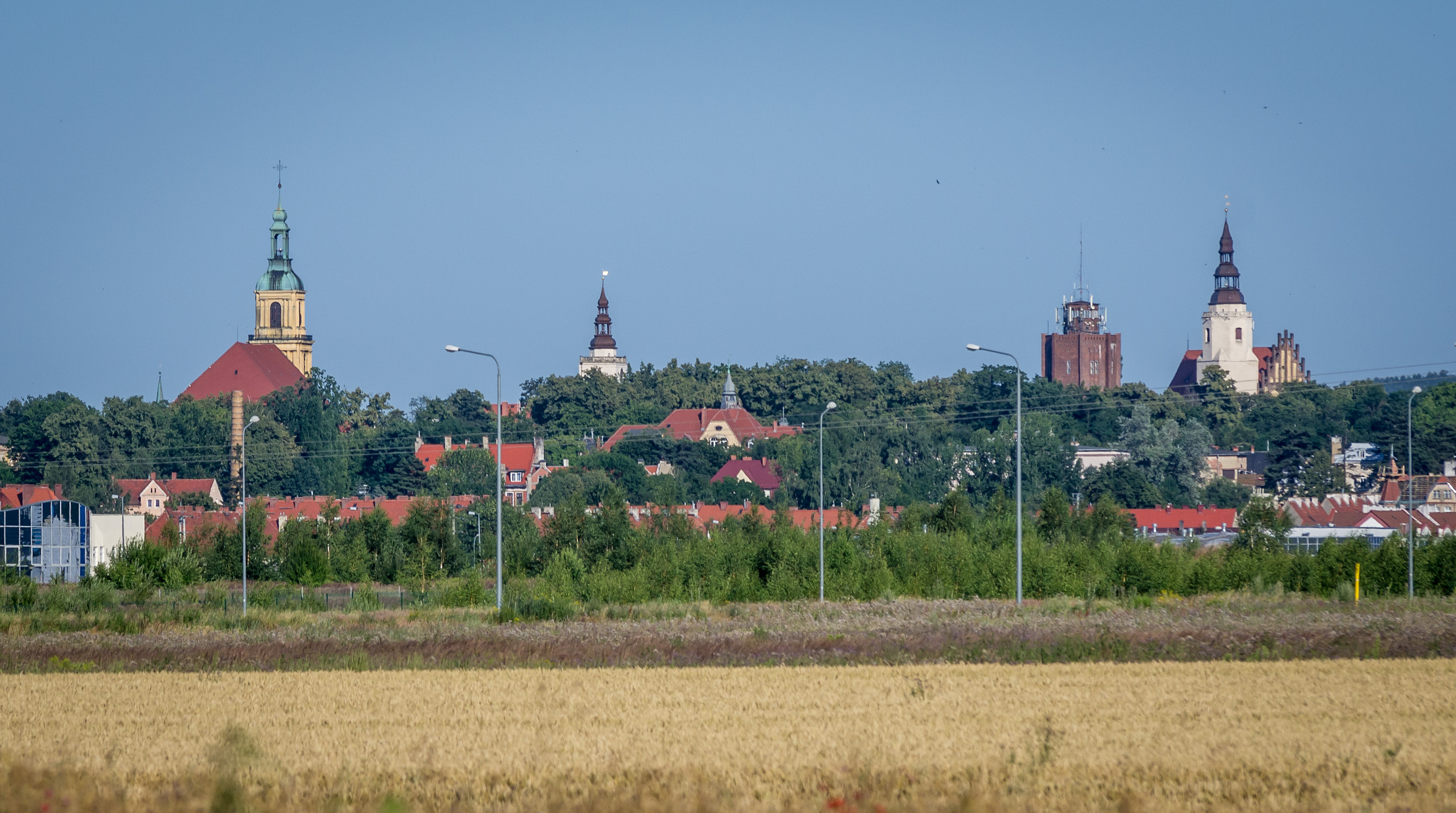
Panorama from the outskirts of the city

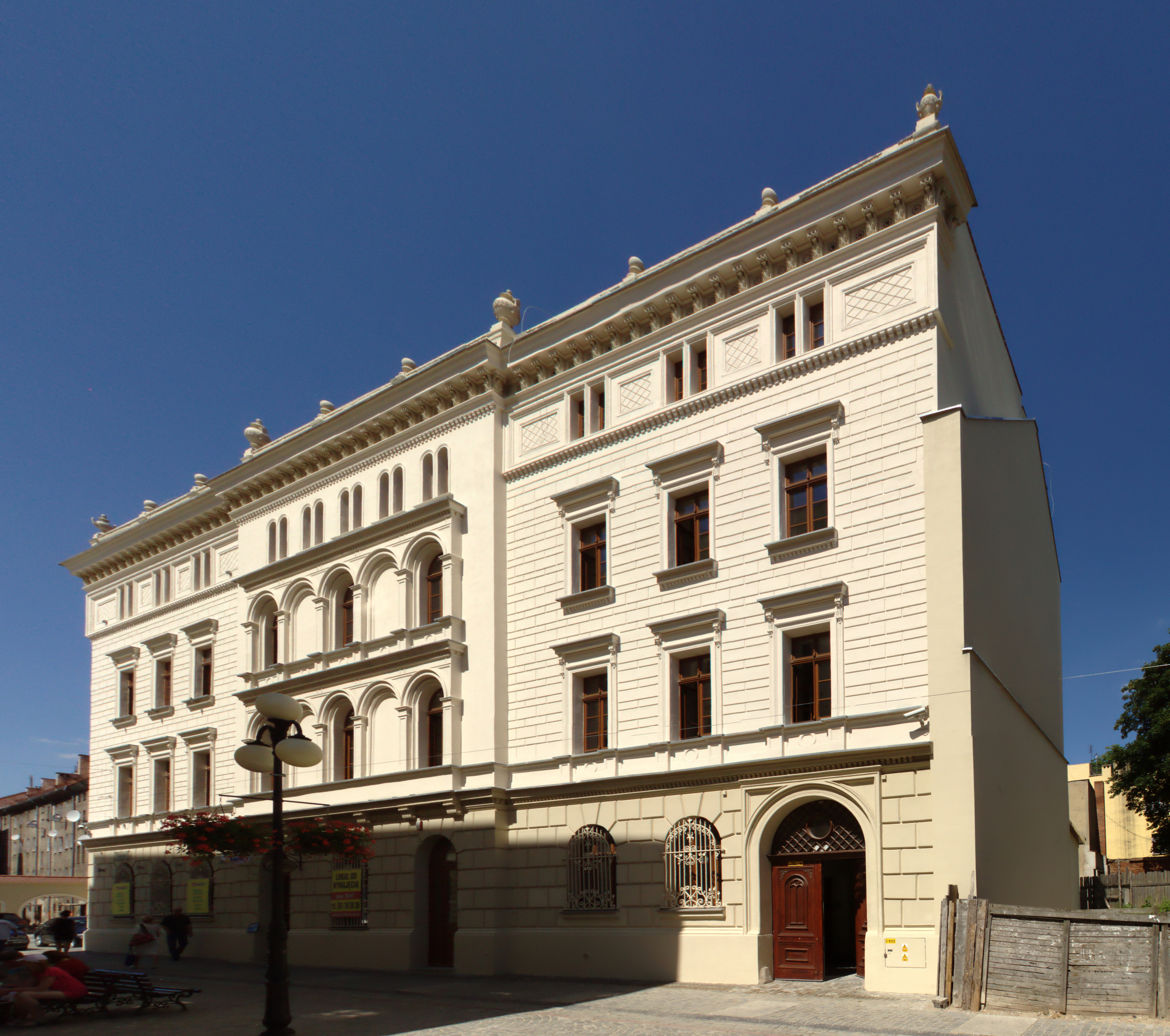
Historic building

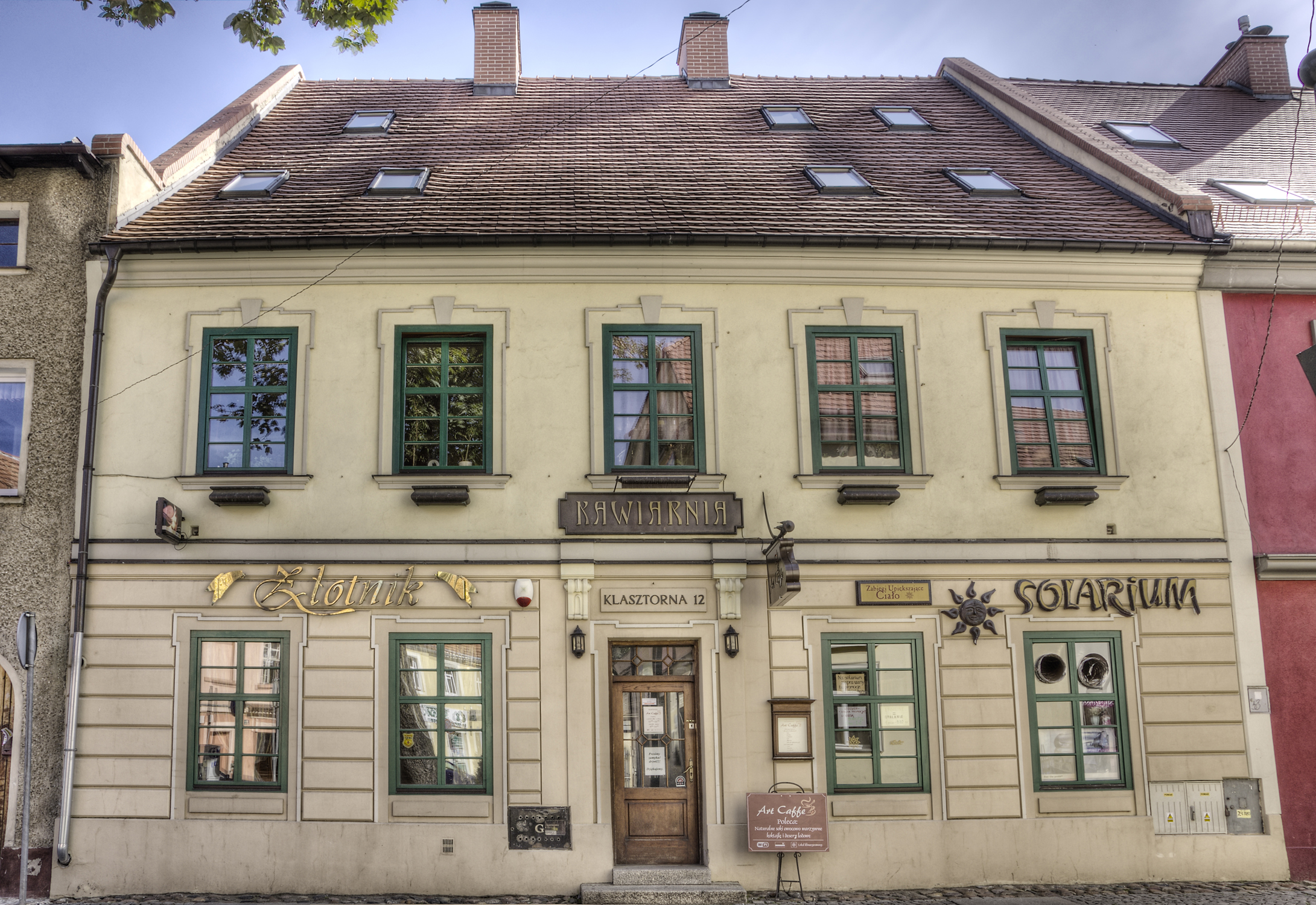
Historic townhouse

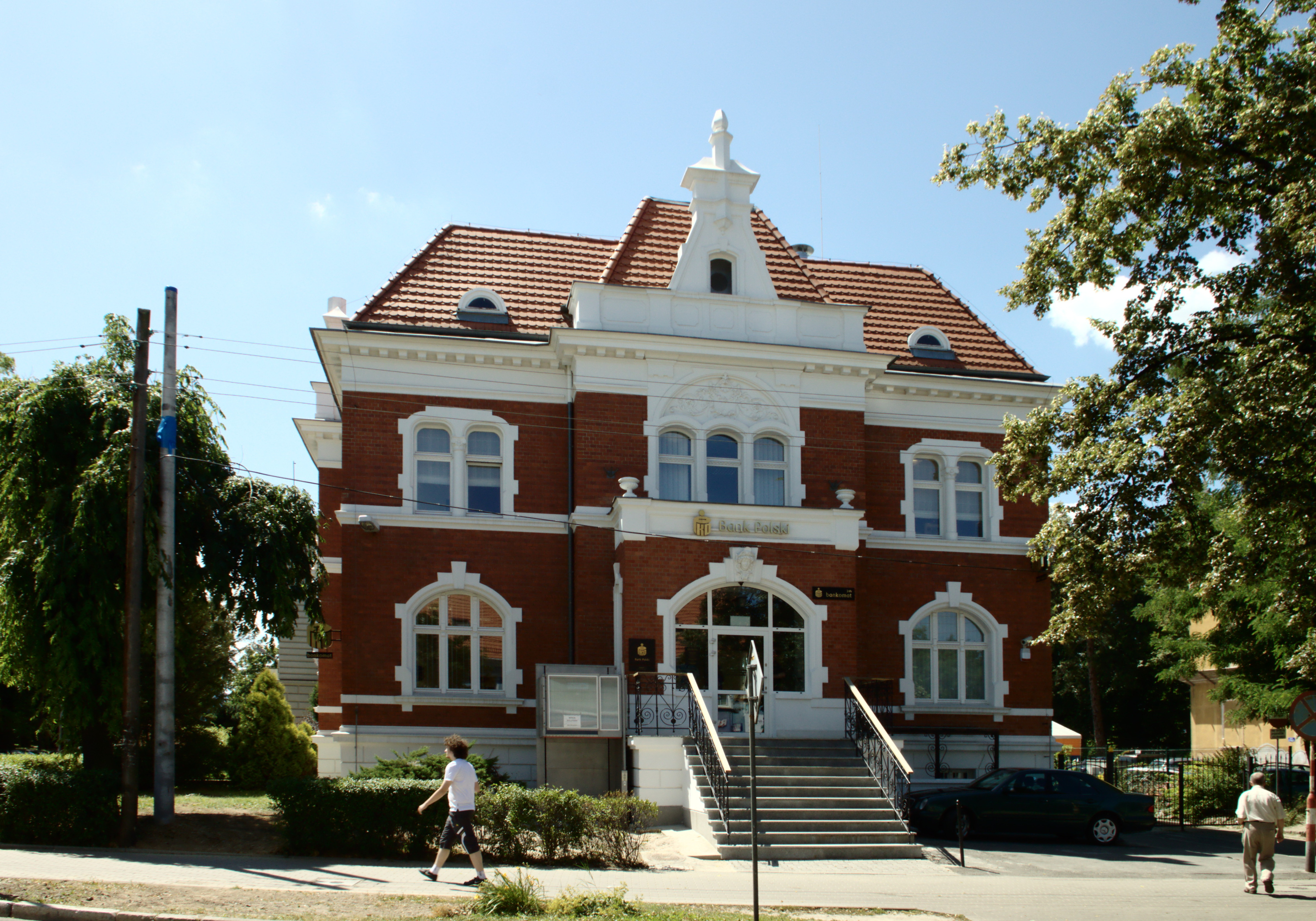
Bank building

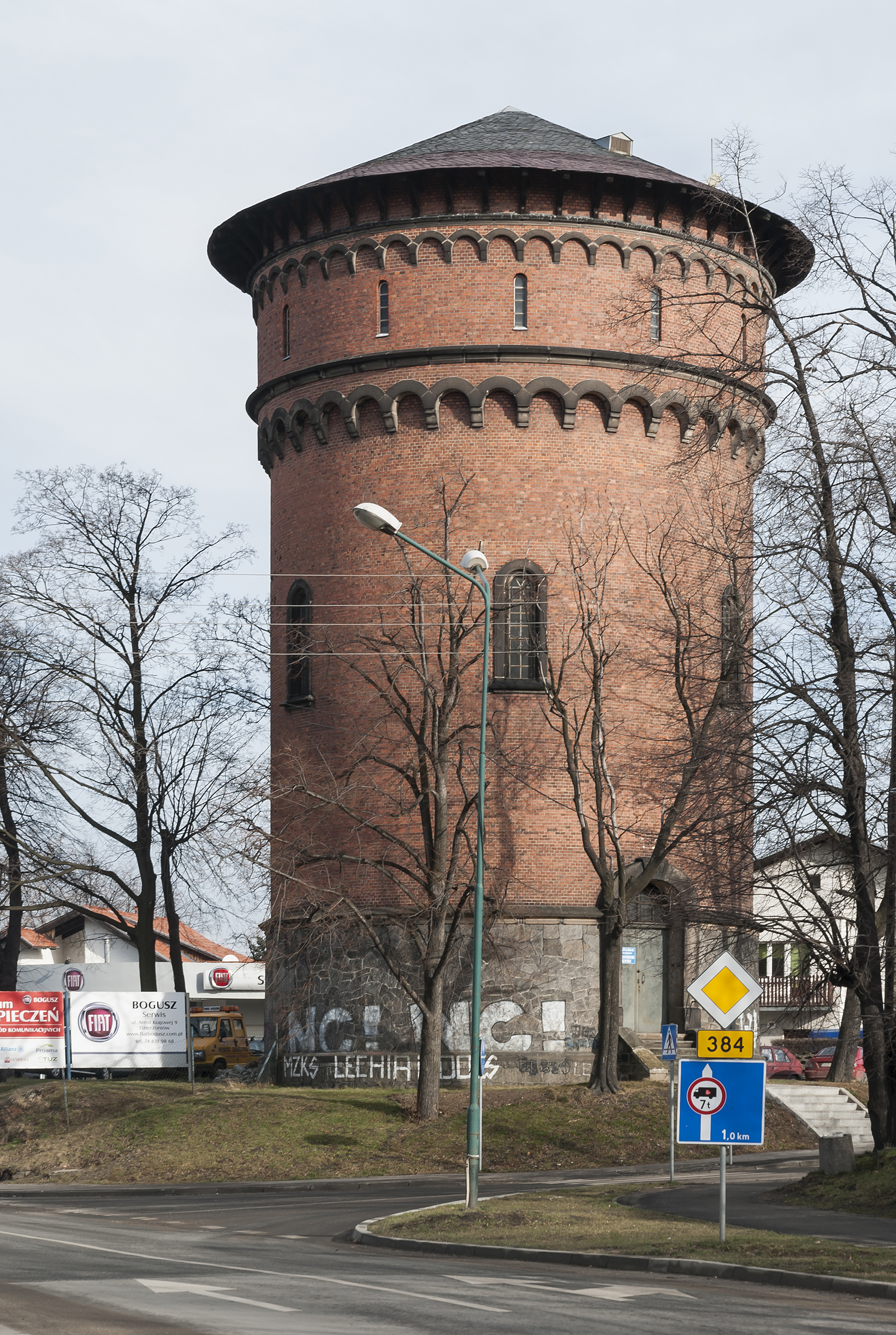
Water tower
