= Borowica =

Borovitsa or Borowica (cyrillic Боровица) is the name of several places in Slavic countries:

Bulgaria (Bulgarian: Боровица)

- Borovitsa, Kardzhali Province, a village
- Borovitsa, Vidin Province, a village
- Borovitsa (river), tributary of the Arda

- Borovitsa (mountain hostel), touristic mountain hostel on Kardzhali Reservoir, named after the river
- Borovitsa dam, Kardzhali Province, on the Borovitsa river

Poland

- Borowica, Lower Silesian Voivodeship (south-west Poland)
- Borowica, Lublin Voivodeship (east Poland)

Russia (Russian: Боровица)

- Borovitsa, Luzsky District, village in Luzsky District, Kirov oblast
- Borovitsa, Murashinsky District, village in Murashinsky District, Kirov oblast
- Borovitsa, Slobodskoy District, village in Slobodskoy District, Kirov oblast
- Borovitsa, Nizhny Novgorod Oblast, village in Borsky District, Nizhny Novgorod oblast
- Borovitsa, Pskov Oblast, village in Usvyatsky District, Pskov oblast
- Borovitsa (Voronezh tributary), tributary of Voronezh River
- Borovitsa (Kubena tributary), tributary of Kubena River

Ukraine (Ukrainian: Боровица)

- Borovytsia, Zhytomyr Oblast, village in Korosten Raion, Zhytomyr Oblast
- Borovytsia, Cherkasy Oblast, village in Cherkasy Raion, Cherkasy Oblast

== See also ==
- Borovica (disambiguation), Serbo-Croatian toponym
- Borovichi, a city in Russia
- Borovička, a juniper brandy from Slovakia
- Boroviće (disambiguation)
- Borowitz (disambiguation)
