= Pilawa (disambiguation) =

Pilawa is a town in Masovian Voivodeship, east-central Poland.

Pilawa may also refer to:

- Piława, Lower Silesian Voivodeship (south-west Poland)
- Pilawa, Piaseczno County in Masovian Voivodeship (east-central Poland)
- Piława, Szczecinek County in West Pomeranian Voivodeship (north-west Poland)
- Piława, Wałcz County in West Pomeranian Voivodeship (north-west Poland)
- Piława, a river in Lower Silesia (south-west Poland)
- Piława, a river near Piła in western Poland
- Piława, Polish name of the Russian seaport Baltiysk
- Jörg Pilawa (born 1965), German television presenter

== See also ==
- Coat of arms of Piława
- Piława Górna, a town on the Piława in Lower Silesia
- Piława Dolna, a village on the Piława in Lower Silesia
