= Książnica =

- Village
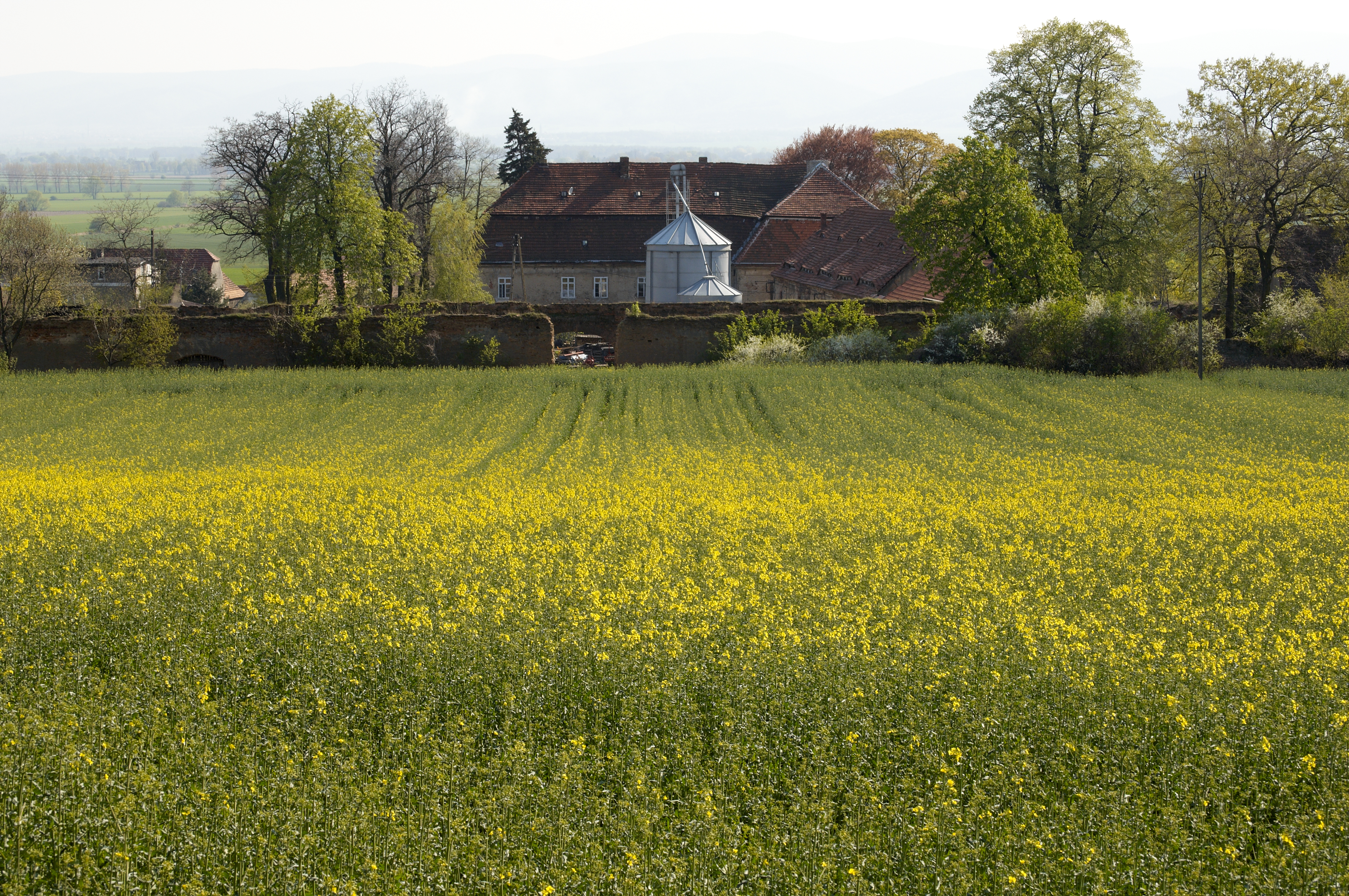

- Location within Poland
- Coordinates: 50°48′38″N 16°36′41″E
- Country: Poland
- Voivodeship: Lower Silesian
- County: Dzierżoniów
- Gmina: Dzierżoniów

Population
  - Total: 450
- Time zone: UTC+1 (CET)
  - Summer (DST): UTC+2 (CEST)
- Vehicle registration: DDZ

Książnica [kɕɔ̃ʐˈɲit͡sa] is a village in the administrative district of Gmina Dzierżoniów, within Dzierżoniów County, Lower Silesian Voivodeship, in south-western Poland.

== History ==
In the final stages of World War II, on 27 January 1945, a German-organized death march of Allied prisoners of war from the Stalag Luft 7 POW camp stopped in the village.
