= Borowitz =

Borowitz may refer to:

- Borovnice (Trutnov District) (Groß Borowitz), German name of the Czech village and municipality in the Trutnov District
- Borovnička (Klein Borowitz), German name of the Czech village and municipality in the Trutnov District

The surname Borowitz is derived from these villages.

== List of people with the surname Borowitz ==
- Abram Solman Borowitz (1910–1985), American humorist, author, and director
- Andy Borowitz (born 1958), American writer, comedian, satirist, and actor
- Eugene Borowitz (1924–2016), American leader and philosopher in Reform Judaism
- Susan Borowitz (born 1959), American television writer and producer

== See also ==
- Borowica (disambiguation)
- Borovský
