= Marianówek, Lower Silesian Voivodeship =

Marianówek
- Village
- Location within Poland
- Coordinates: 50°43′15″N 16°42′46″E
- Country: Poland
- Voivodeship: Lower Silesian
- County: Dzierżoniów
- Gmina: Dzierżoniów
- Time zone: UTC+1 (CET)
  - Summer (DST): UTC+2 (CEST)
- Vehicle registration: DDZ

Marianówek [marjaˈnuvɛk] is a village in the administrative district of Gmina Dzierżoniów, within Dzierżoniów County, Lower Silesian Voivodeship, in south-western Poland.
