= Kuczaba =

Mountain in Poland

Highest point
- Elevation: 654 m (2,146 ft)
- Coordinates: 50°38′52.19″N 16°35′24.14″E

Geography
- Location: Lower Silesian Voivodeship, Poland
- Parent range: Owl Mountains

Kuczaba is a mountain in the Owl Mountains, part of Central Sudetes. Its height is 654 m. It lies in Owl Mountains Landscape Park.

The mountain is located next to Jodłownik in Dzierżoniów County, Lower Silesian Voivodeship, in south-western Poland.
