= Moisiu =

Moisiu is an Albanian surname. Notable people with the surname include:

- Aleksandër Moisiu (1879–1935), Austrian stage actor
- Alfred Moisiu (born 1929), Albanian diplomat and politician
- Spiro Moisiu (1900–1981), Albanian military officer

== See also ==
- Mojsije
