= Dobrocin =

Dobrocin may refer to the following places in Poland:

- Dobrocin, Lower Silesian Voivodeship (south-west Poland)
- Dobrocin, Warmian-Masurian Voivodeship (north Poland)
