= Owiesno =

- Village
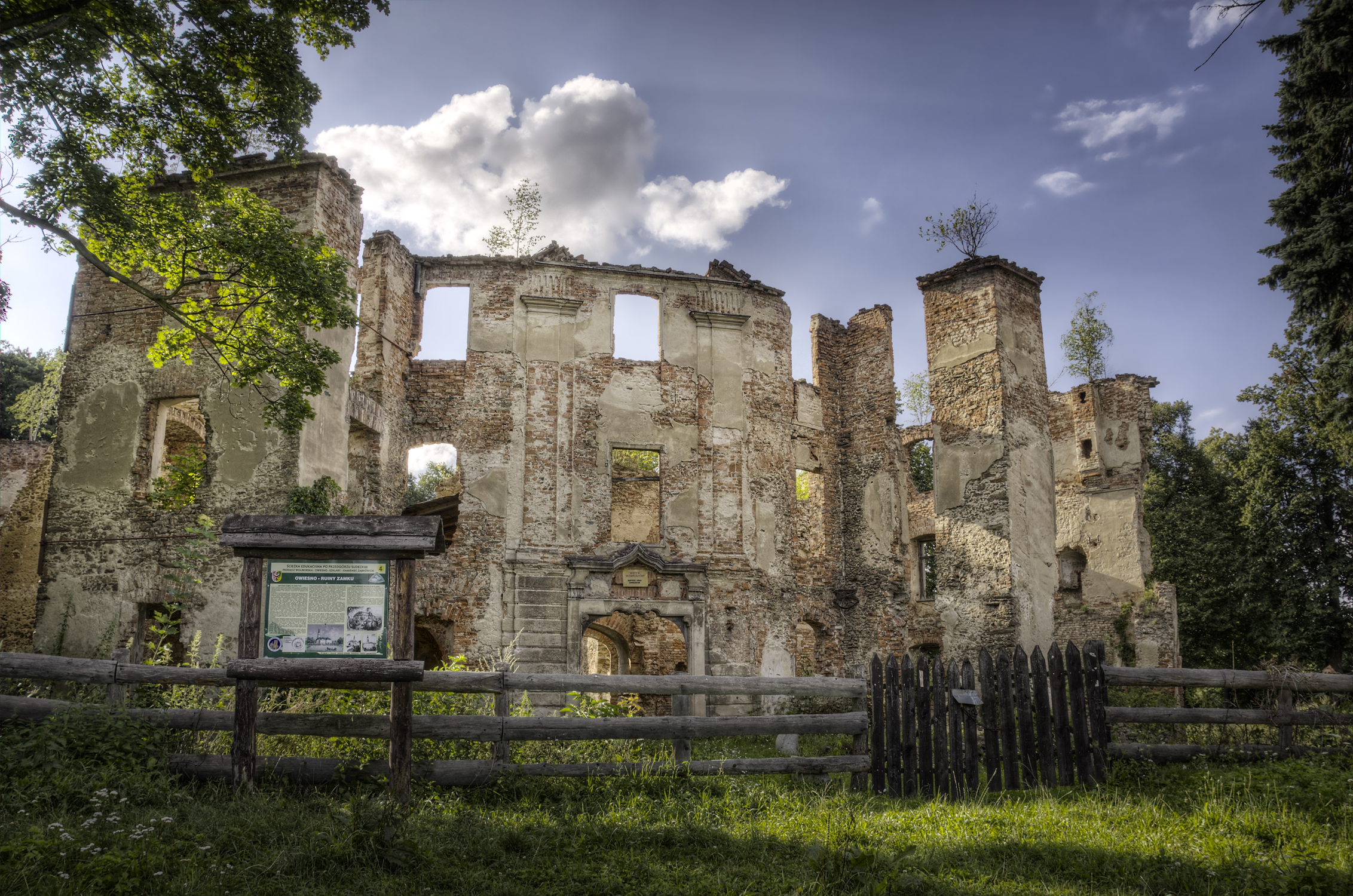
- Ruins of the medieval Owiesno Castle

- Location within Poland
- Coordinates: 50°40′N 16°42′E
- Country: Poland
- Voivodeship: Lower Silesian
- County: Dzierżoniów
- Gmina: Dzierżoniów
- First mentioned: 1260
- Elevation: 400 m (1,300 ft)

Population
  - Total: 580
- Time zone: UTC+1 (CET)
  - Summer (DST): UTC+2 (CEST)
- Postal code: 58-262
- Vehicle registration: DDZ

Owiesno [ɔˈvjɛsnɔ] is a village in the administrative district of Gmina Dzierżoniów, within Dzierżoniów County, Lower Silesian Voivodeship, in south-western Poland.

== History ==
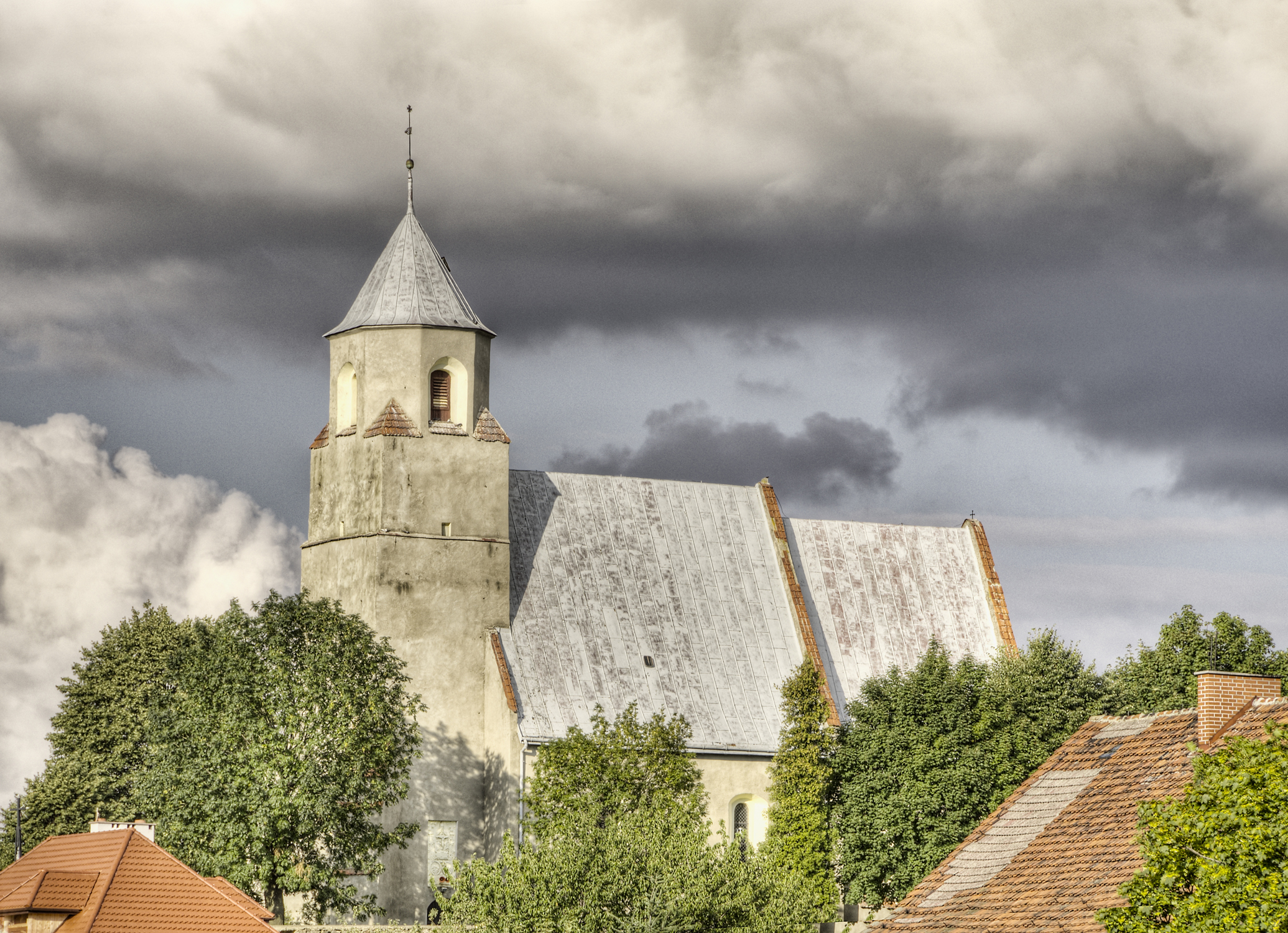
Holy Trinity church in Owiesno

Owiesno was first mentioned as Ovesonovo in a 1260 deed and as Haverdorph in 1292, when it was part of medieval Piast-ruled Poland. Later on, the village passed to Bohemia, Hungary, Austria, Prussia and Germany, before it became again part of Poland following the defeat of Germany in World War II in 1945.

Upon the foundations of an old Knights Templar castle Przecław of Pogorzela, the Bishop of Wrocław and chancellor of Emperor Charles IV, had a palace erected in the 14th century. It was rebuilt several times and decayed after 1945 so only ruins remain.

The Holy Trinity church (Polish: Kościół Św. Trójcy) was erected about 1583 and received a Baroque equipment including an altar with a Trinity painting about 1730.
