= Ostroszowice =

- Village
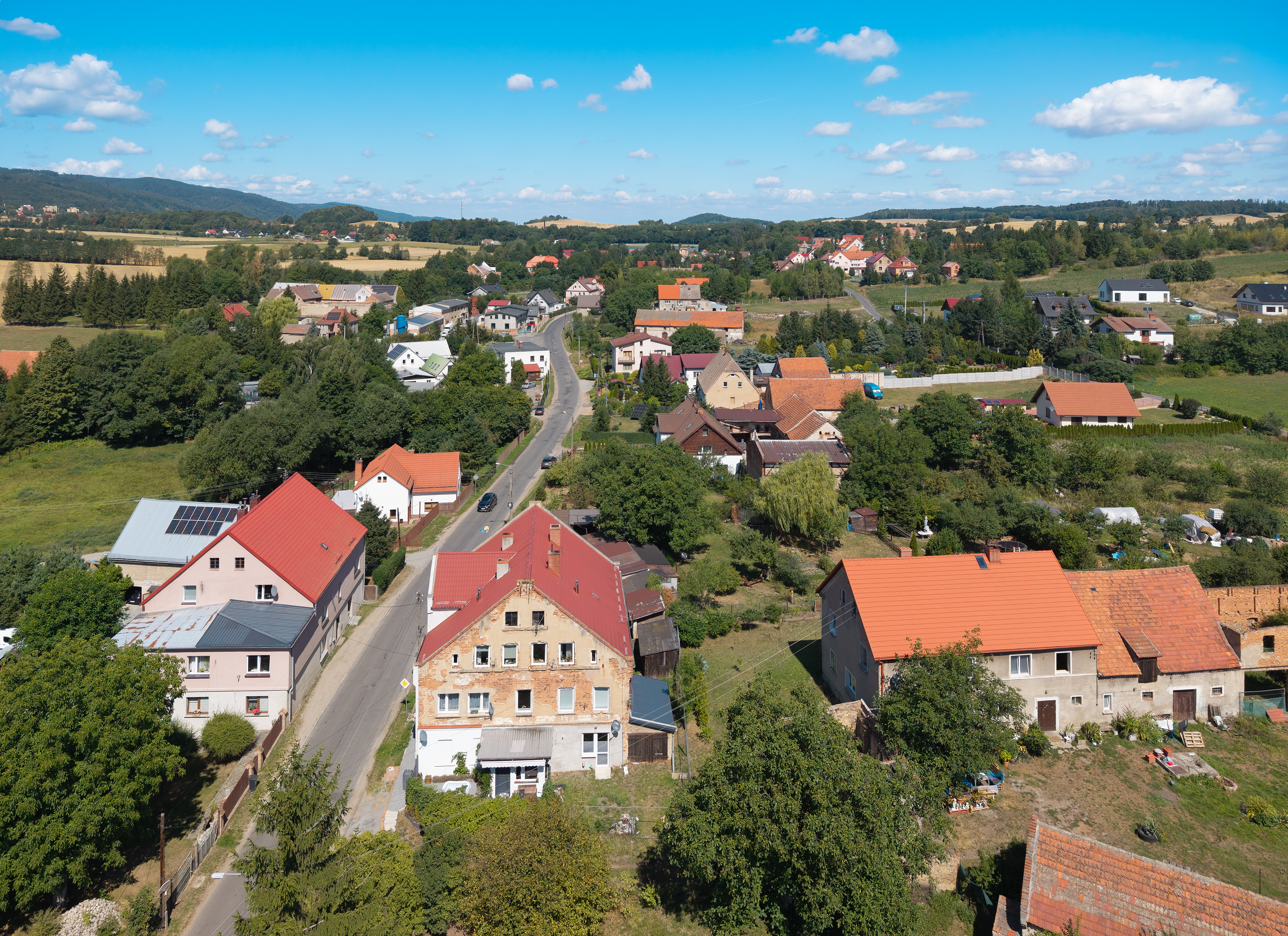

- Location within Poland
- Coordinates: 50°38′N 16°38′E
- Country: Poland
- Voivodeship: Lower Silesian
- County: Dzierżoniów
- Gmina: Dzierżoniów

Population
  - Total: 1,400
- Time zone: UTC+1 (CET)
  - Summer (DST): UTC+2 (CEST)
- Vehicle registration: DDZ

Ostroszowice [ɔstrɔʂɔˈvit͡sɛ] is a village in the administrative district of Gmina Dzierżoniów, within Dzierżoniów County, Lower Silesian Voivodeship, in south-western Poland.

== History ==
During World War II, the Germans established and operated a forced labour subcamp of the Stalag VIII-A prisoner-of-war camp in the village.
