= Kiełczyn, Lower Silesian Voivodeship =

Kiełczyn
- Village
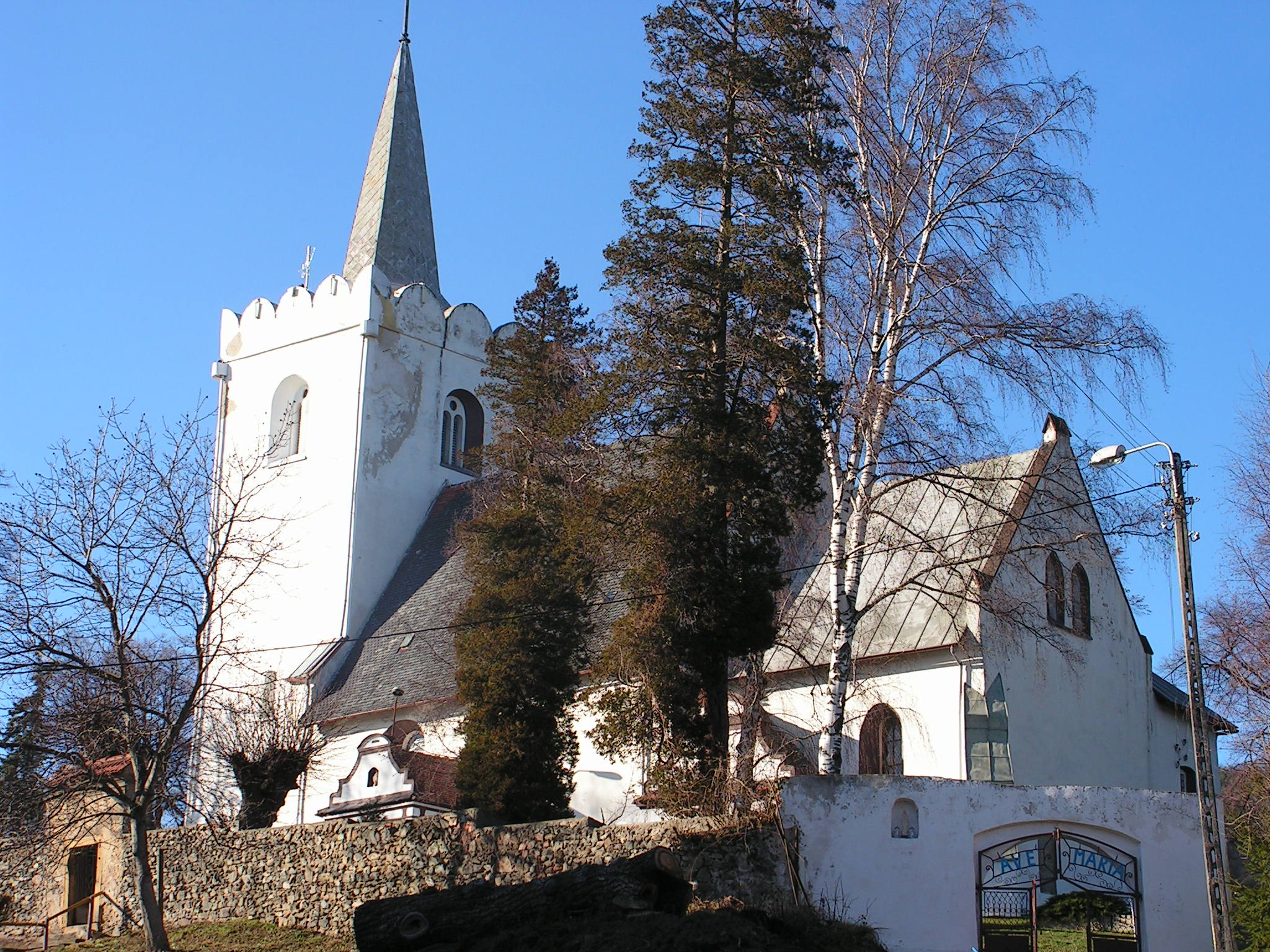

- Location within Poland
- Coordinates: 50°48′28″N 16°38′37″E
- Country: Poland
- Voivodeship: Lower Silesian
- County: Dzierżoniów
- Gmina: Dzierżoniów
- Population: 350
- Time zone: UTC+1 (CET)
  - Summer (DST): UTC+2 (CEST)
- Vehicle registration: DDZ

Kiełczyn [ˈkʲɛu̯t͡ʂɨn] is a village in the administrative district of Gmina Dzierżoniów, within Dzierżoniów County, Lower Silesian Voivodeship, in south-western Poland.
