= Gmina Dzierżoniów =

Gmina Dzierżoniów Dzierżoniów Commune
- Gmina
- Flag Coat of arms
- Interactive map of Gmina Dzierżoniów
- Coordinates (Dzierżoniów): 50°43′N 16°33′E
- Country: Poland
- Voivodeship: Lower Silesian
- County: Dzierżoniów
- Seat: Dzierżoniów
- Sołectwos: Dobrocin, Jędrzejowice, Jodłownik, Kiełczyn, Książnica, Mościsko, Myśliszów, Nowizna, Ostroszowice, Owiesno, Piława Dolna, Roztocznik, Tuszyn, Uciechów, Włóki

Area
  - Total: 142.05 km^{2} (54.85 sq mi)

Population (2019-06-30)
  - Total: 9,114
  - Density: 64.16/km^{2} (166.2/sq mi)
- Website: http://www.ug.dzierzoniow.pl/

Gmina Dzierżoniów is a rural gmina (administrative district) in Dzierżoniów County, Lower Silesian Voivodeship, in south-western Poland. Its seat is the town of Dzierżoniów, although the town is not part of the territory of the gmina.

The gmina covers an area of 142.05 square kilometres (54.85 sq mi), and as of 2019 its total population is 9,114.

== Neighbouring gminas ==
Gmina Dzierżoniów is bordered by the towns of Bielawa, Dzierżoniów, Pieszyce and Piława Górna, and by the gminas of Łagiewniki, Marcinowice, Niemcza, Nowa Ruda, Stoszowice and Świdnica.

== Villages ==
The gmina contains the villages of Albinów, Borowica, Byszów, Dębowa Góra, Dobrocin, Dobrocinek, Jędrzejowice, Jodłownik, Kiełczyn, Kietlice, Kołaczów, Książnica, Marianówek, Mościsko, Myśliszów, Nowizna, Ostroszowice, Owiesno, Piława Dolna, Roztocznik, Tuszyn, Uciechów, Wiatraczyn and Włóki.

== Twin towns – sister cities ==
Gmina Dzierżoniów is twinned with:

- Cekcyn, Poland
- Dolní Čermná, Czech Republic
