= Tuszyn (disambiguation) =

Tuszyn may refer to the following places in Poland:

- Tuszyn, a town in Łódź East County, Łódź Voivodeship
- Tuszyn, Lower Silesian Voivodeship (south-west Poland)
- Tuszyn, Pajęczno County in Łódź Voivodeship (central Poland)
