= Mościsko =

- Village
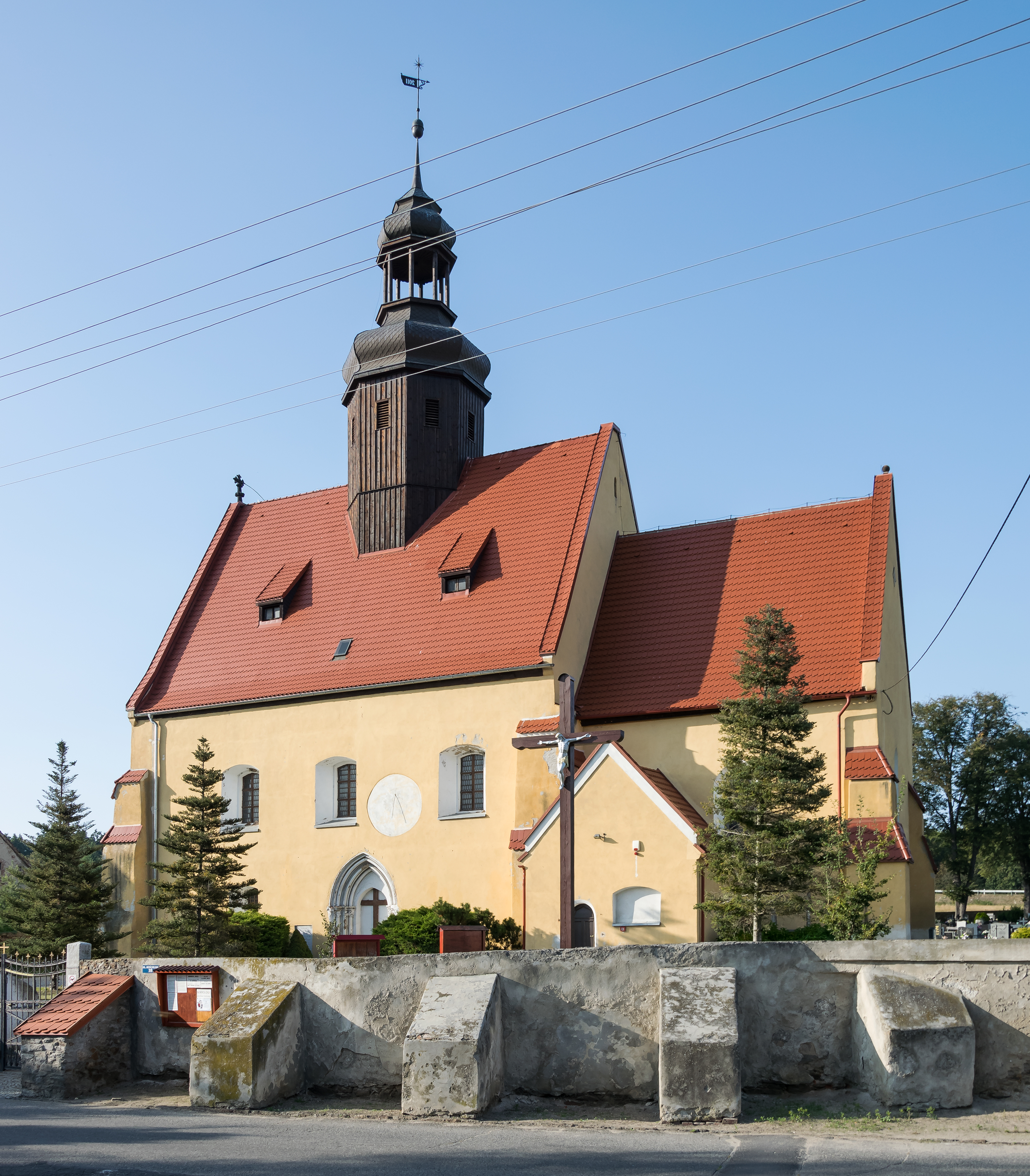
- John the Baptist church

- Location within Poland
- Coordinates: 50°46′51″N 16°35′20″E
- Country: Poland
- Voivodeship: Lower Silesian
- County: Dzierżoniów
- Gmina: Dzierżoniów

Population (2011)
  - Total: 1,128
- Time zone: UTC+1 (CET)
  - Summer (DST): UTC+2 (CEST)
- Postal code: 58-116
- Vehicle registration: DDZ

Mościsko [mɔɕˈt͡ɕiskɔ] is a village in the administrative district of Gmina Dzierżoniów, within Dzierżoniów County, Lower Silesian Voivodeship, in south-western Poland.

During World War II, from March 1941 to autumn of 1944, Nazi Germany operated a forced labour camp for Jewish men in the village.

== Notable people ==
- Mojsije Margel (1875–1939), Croatian rabbi, lexicographer and Hebrew scholar
