= Uciechów, Lower Silesian Voivodeship =

Uciechów
- Village
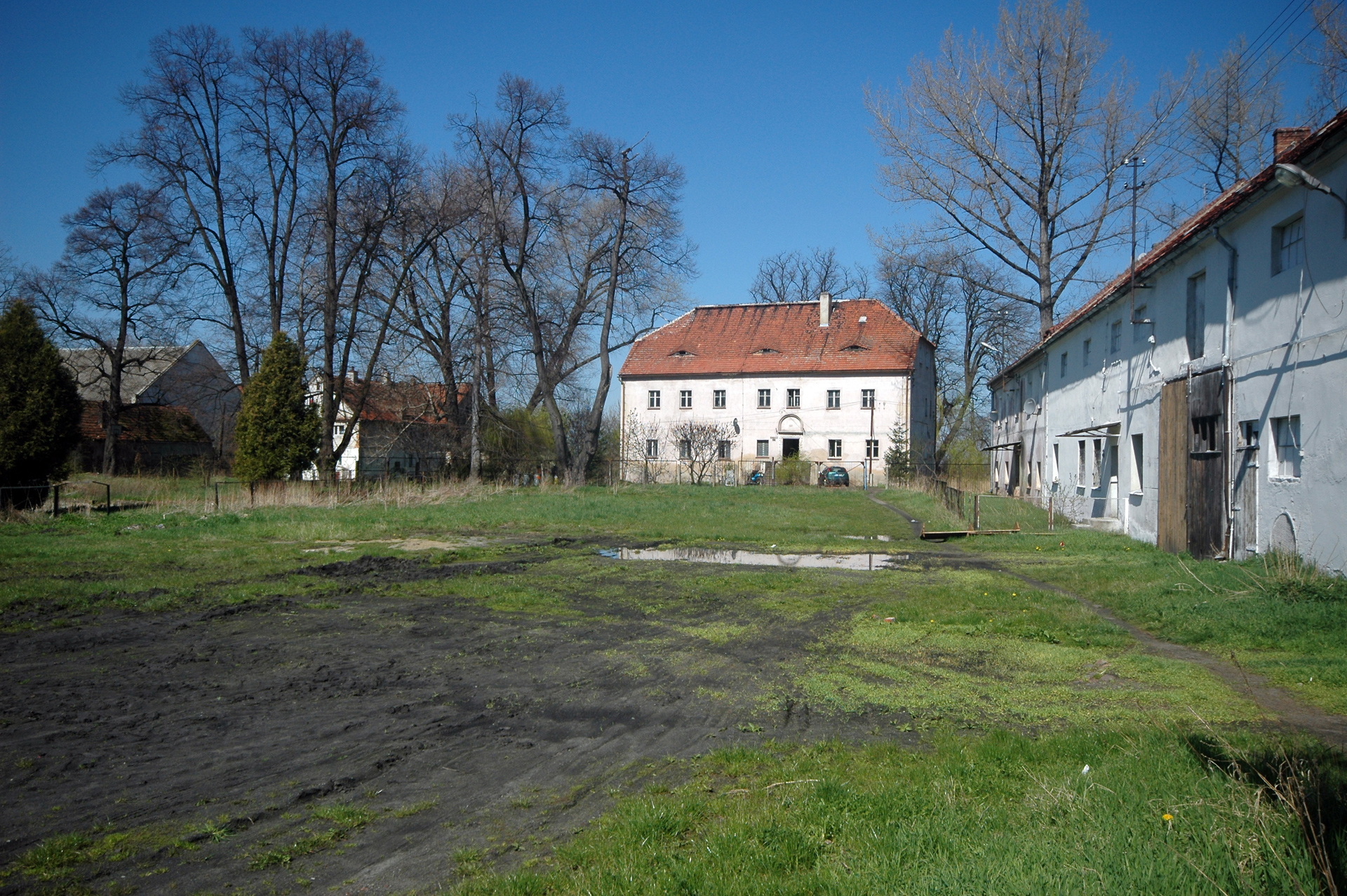
- Manor

- Location within Poland
- Coordinates: 50°45′N 16°40′E
- Country: Poland
- Voivodeship: Lower Silesian
- County: Dzierżoniów
- Gmina: Dzierżoniów
- Population: 1,000
- Time zone: UTC+1 (CET)
  - Summer (DST): UTC+2 (CEST)
- Vehicle registration: DDZ

Uciechów [uˈt͡ɕɛxuf] is a village in Gmina Dzierżoniów, part of Dzierżoniów County in the Lower Silesian Voivodeship of south-western Poland.
