= Dobrocinek =

Dobrocinek may refer to the following places in Poland:

- Dobrocinek, Lower Silesian Voivodeship (south-west Poland)
- Dobrocinek, Warmian-Masurian Voivodeship (north Poland)
