= Dębowa Góra =

Dębowa Góra may refer to the following places in Poland:

- Dębowa Góra, Lower Silesian Voivodeship (south-west Poland)
- Dębowa Góra, Kutno County in Łódź Voivodeship (central Poland)
- Dębowa Góra, Piotrków County in Łódź Voivodeship (central Poland)
- Dębowa Góra, Skierniewice County in Łódź Voivodeship (central Poland)
- Dębowa Góra, Silesian Voivodeship (south Poland)
- Dębowa Góra, Pomeranian Voivodeship (north Poland)
- Dębowa Góra, Warmian-Masurian Voivodeship (north Poland)
