= Byszów, Lower Silesian Voivodeship =

Byszów
- Village
- Location within Poland
- Coordinates: 50°43′45″N 16°44′28″E
- Country: Poland
- Voivodeship: Lower Silesian
- County: Dzierżoniów
- Gmina: Dzierżoniów
- Population: 60

Byszów [ˈbɨʂuf] is a village in the administrative district of Gmina Dzierżoniów, within Dzierżoniów County, Lower Silesian Voivodeship, in south-western Poland.
