= Albinów, Lower Silesian Voivodeship =

Albinów
- Village
- Location within Poland
- Coordinates: 50°46′41″N 16°40′14″E
- Country: Poland
- Voivodeship: Lower Silesian
- County: Dzierżoniów
- Gmina: Dzierżoniów

Albinów [alˈbinuf] is a village in the administrative district of Gmina Dzierżoniów, within Dzierżoniów County, Lower Silesian Voivodeship, in south-western Poland.
