= Wloki =

Wloki may refer to the following places in Poland:

- Włoki, West Pomeranian Voivodeship (north-west Poland)
- Włóki, Lower Silesian Voivodeship (south-west Poland)
- Włóki, Kuyavian-Pomeranian Voivodeship (north-central Poland)
- Włóki, Masovian Voivodeship (east-central Poland)
