= Jędrzejowice, Dzierżoniów County =

Jędrzejowice
- Village
- Location within Poland
- Coordinates: 50°50′N 16°40′E
- Country: Poland
- Voivodeship: Lower Silesian
- County: Dzierżoniów
- Gmina: Dzierżoniów

Population
  - Total: 60
- Time zone: UTC+1 (CET)
  - Summer (DST): UTC+2 (CEST)
- Vehicle registration: DDZ

Jędrzejowice (Polish: [jɛndʐɛjɔˈvitsɛ]) is a village in the administrative district of Gmina Dzierżoniów, within Dzierżoniów County, Lower Silesian Voivodeship, in south-western Poland.
