= Roztocznik =

- Village
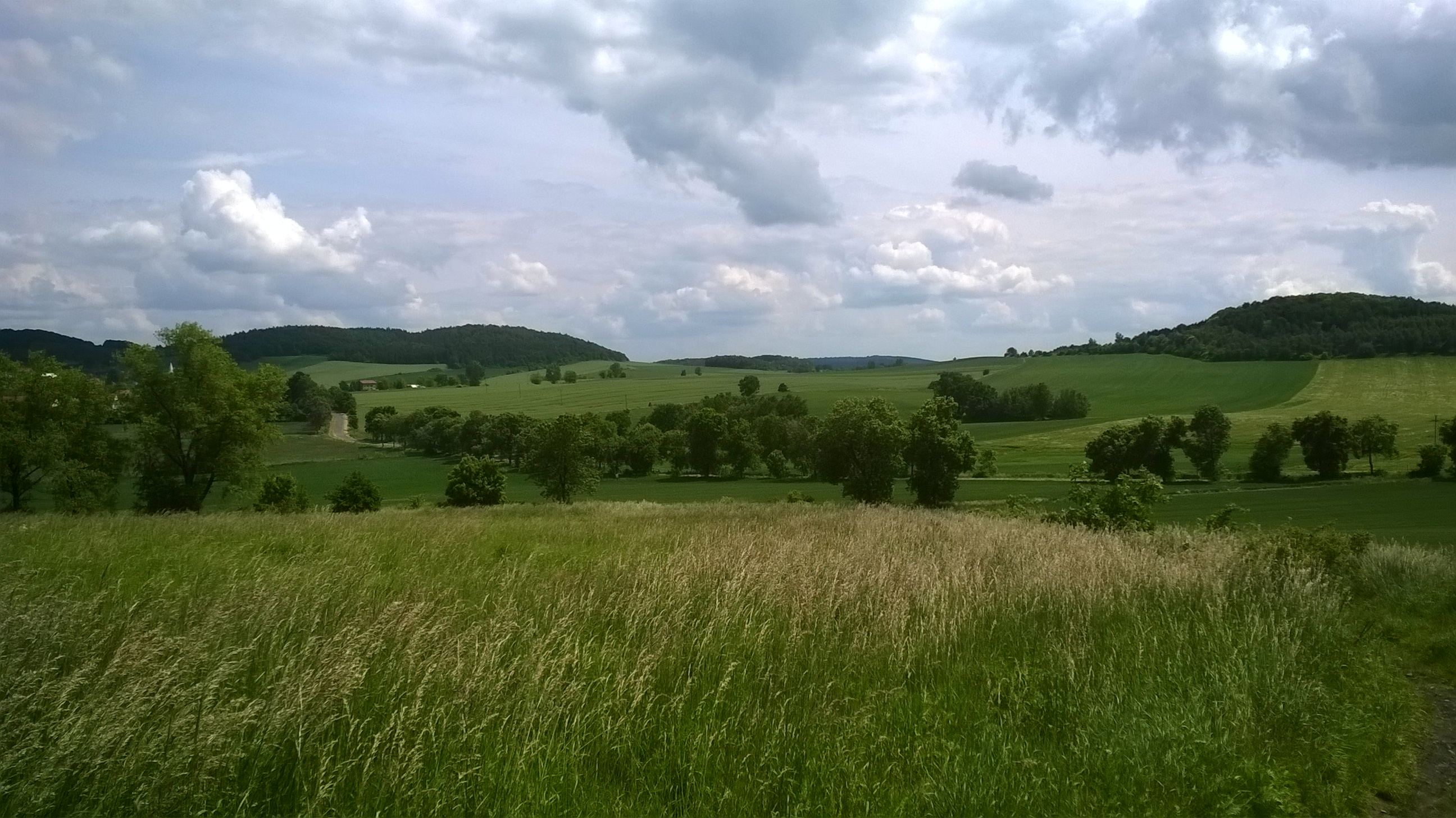
- Field in Roztocznik

- Location within Poland
- Coordinates: 50°45′N 16°44′E
- Country: Poland
- Voivodeship: Lower Silesian
- County: Dzierżoniów
- Gmina: Dzierżoniów
- First mentioned: ca. 1305

Population (31.12.2014)
  - Total: 499
- Time zone: UTC+1 (CET)
  - Summer (DST): UTC+2 (CEST)
- Vehicle registration: DDZ
- Website: http://www.roztocznik.pl

Roztocznik [rɔsˈtɔt͡ʂnik] is a village in the administrative district of Gmina Dzierżoniów, within Dzierżoniów County, Lower Silesian Voivodeship, in south-western Poland.

== History ==
The earliest mention of the village was included in the Liber fundationis episcopatus Vratislaviensis from around 1305, when it was part of fragmented Piast-ruled Poland. Later on, it was part of Bohemia, Austria, Prussia (within the Holy Roman Empire until 1806) and Germany. It appeared under various names throughout history, including Alberti villa in 1305, Albrechtsdorf in 1375, Olbersdorff or Olbrechtsdorf in 1677, and Ullersdorf in 1785. Initially, within medieval Poland, the village was owned by the monastery, later the Knights Templar. In 1375 the first known owner of the village was Hannose von Liebenow. Already in 1395, the owner of the village was Martin Yrbini Joanni von Liebnaw and in 1550 - von Ullersdorf. In the mid-seventeenth century the village was owned by the family von Knobelsdorf. In 1728, the owner of the goods was Joseph von und Karriss Rosenhang. In 1840, the owner of the village was Baron Ferdinand von Seherr-Thoss, and in 1870 Countess Marie of the same family. Then the goods belonged to the family von Seidlitz-Sandreczki. Its last owner (until 1945) was Major Adolf Graf von Seidlitz-Sandreczki. In the nineteenth century, the village had a population of 606, and the people were mostly engaged in weaving cotton, trade to a small extent, sheep and cattle.

During World War II, the Germans operated the E381 forced labour subcamp of the Stalag VIII-B/344 prisoner-of-war camp in the village. After Germany's defeat in the war, in 1945, the village became again part of Poland as Albertów, and since September 1, 1947 under its current name.

== Mansion, residence, school ==
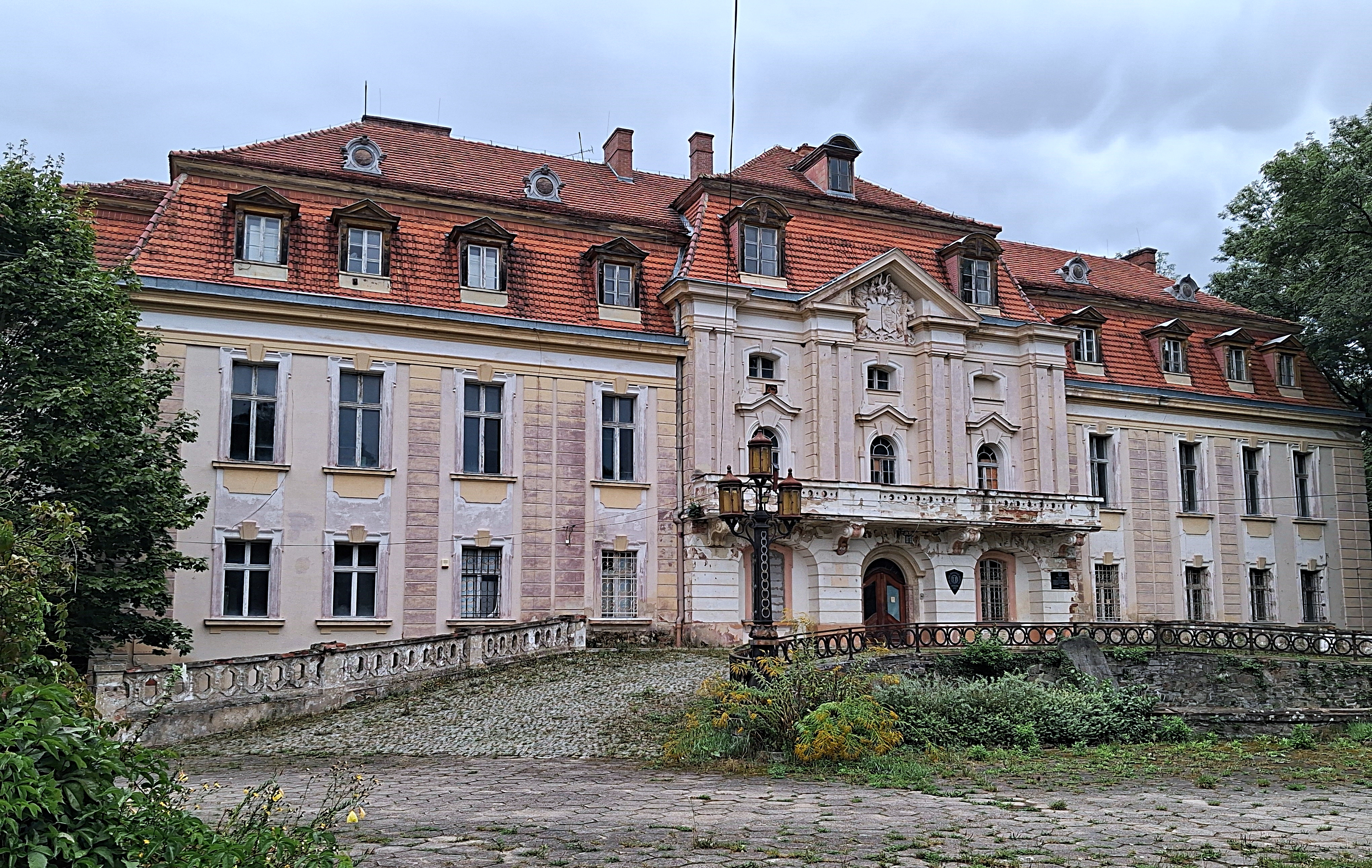
Palace in Roztocznik

First, a Renaissance mansion was built on the site in the sixteenth century. The remains of its walls were in the palace, built in the late eighteenth century, when the village belonged to the family von Seherr-Thoss. Today's form - Neo-Baroque mansion - gave the palace reconstruction in 1910, at the request of the then owners of the property, the family von Seidlitz-Sandreczki. Collections of the Staatsarchiv Breslau (Breslau State Archive) were hidden in the palace at the end of the war. After the war, the palace was expropriated and an agricultural school established, which in the 80s was transformed into the School of Agricultural Mechanization and the Team of Schools for them. In 1993 the building burned. The last students in 2005. The abandoned palace gradually fell into disrepair. April 23, 2012. "Investment Ear" sp. Z oo from Wrocław acquired from the District Dzierżoniów palace and park in Roztoczniku to create a care center for the elderly. It consists of a palace in neo-baroque style (area of more than 2.1 thousand. Sq.m.), the former boarding school (it will go to the spring of 2015 years former residents) and a park with old trees, paths and a pond.

The architecture of the palace

The neo-baroque palace was built on the plan of the letter L. In 1910, reconstruction took place, following which the residence received today's appearance. The building has a basement and a usable attic.

The facade is drawn as a two-storey, covered with a high-pitched mansard roof with dormers. Isolated projection topped with a triangular tympanum. Above the main entrance there is a balcony decorated with a balustrade, and above cartouche with labrami and trzymaczami in the form of two soldiers. The facades of the palace are decorated with rustication corner and extended cornice. On the axis of the facade is the main entrance to the palace, leading to a large lobby, decorated with two arcades supported on a pillar. The entrance leads symmetrical oval driveway.

The room of the first floor are decorated on the vaults Neo-Rococo stucco. In turn, the second floor has been terminated as a series of rooms in a dwutraktowym, which were laid out on the axis of the most representative room - on a square layout - which is the main living area. It is richly decorated with pilaster strips, festoons and oval medallions. The decor includes walls and ceiling of the room, in addition to the corners are niches in which the former permanent sculpture. Stucco in soft colors and a ceiling decorated with a fresco depicting dancing children. Preserved neo-Baroque stucco rocaille motifs and garlands plant. Next to the palace is preserved fragment of the original landscaped park founded in the late eighteenth century, with a pond and partly preserved layout of paths and old trees. Other preserved buildings of the complex is a smithy and coach house.
