= Wilczyna (mountain) =

Mountain in Poland

Coordinates: 50°40′08″N 16°34′12″E

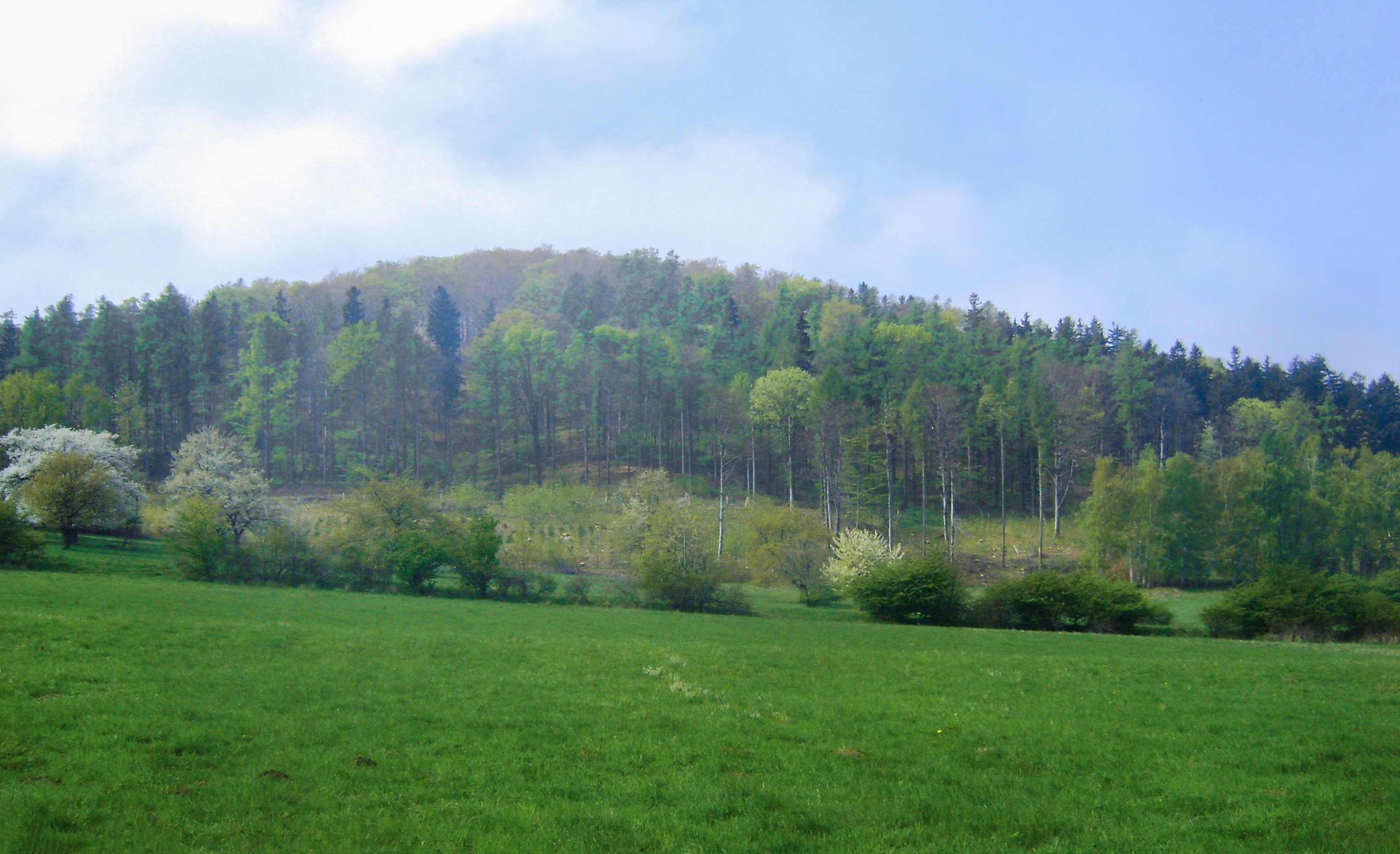
- Wilczyna.

Highest point
- Elevation: 665 m (2,182 ft)

Geography
- Location: Lower Silesian Voivodeship, Poland
- Parent range: Owl Mountains

The Wilczyna (German: Wolfsberg) is a mountain in the Owl Mountains, part of Central Sudetes. Its height is 665 metres above sea level. It lies in Owl Mountains Landscape Park.

The mountain is situated in Dzierżoniów County, Lower Silesian Voivodeship, in south-western Poland.
