= Piława Dolna =

- Village
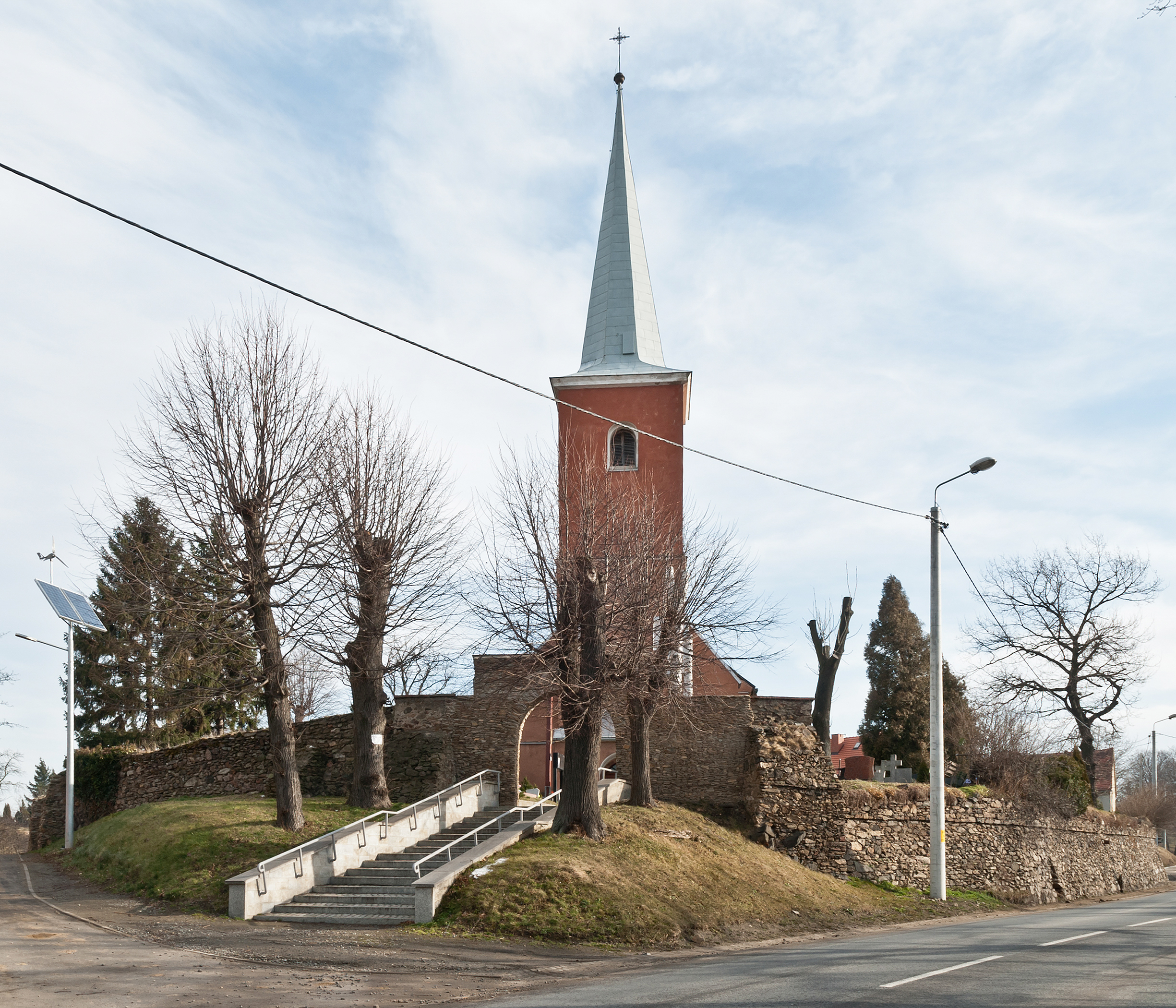
- Church of Saint Catherine

- Location within Poland
- Coordinates: 50°41′31″N 16°42′13″E
- Country: Poland
- Voivodeship: Lower Silesian
- County: Dzierżoniów
- Gmina: Dzierżoniów

Population
  - Total: 1,700
- Time zone: UTC+1 (CET)
  - Summer (DST): UTC+2 (CEST)
- Vehicle registration: DDZ

Piława Dolna [piˈwava ˈdɔlna] is a village in the administrative district of Gmina Dzierżoniów, within Dzierżoniów County, Lower Silesian Voivodeship, in south-western Poland. It is situated on the Piława River.
