= Radunia (hill) =

Mountain in Poland

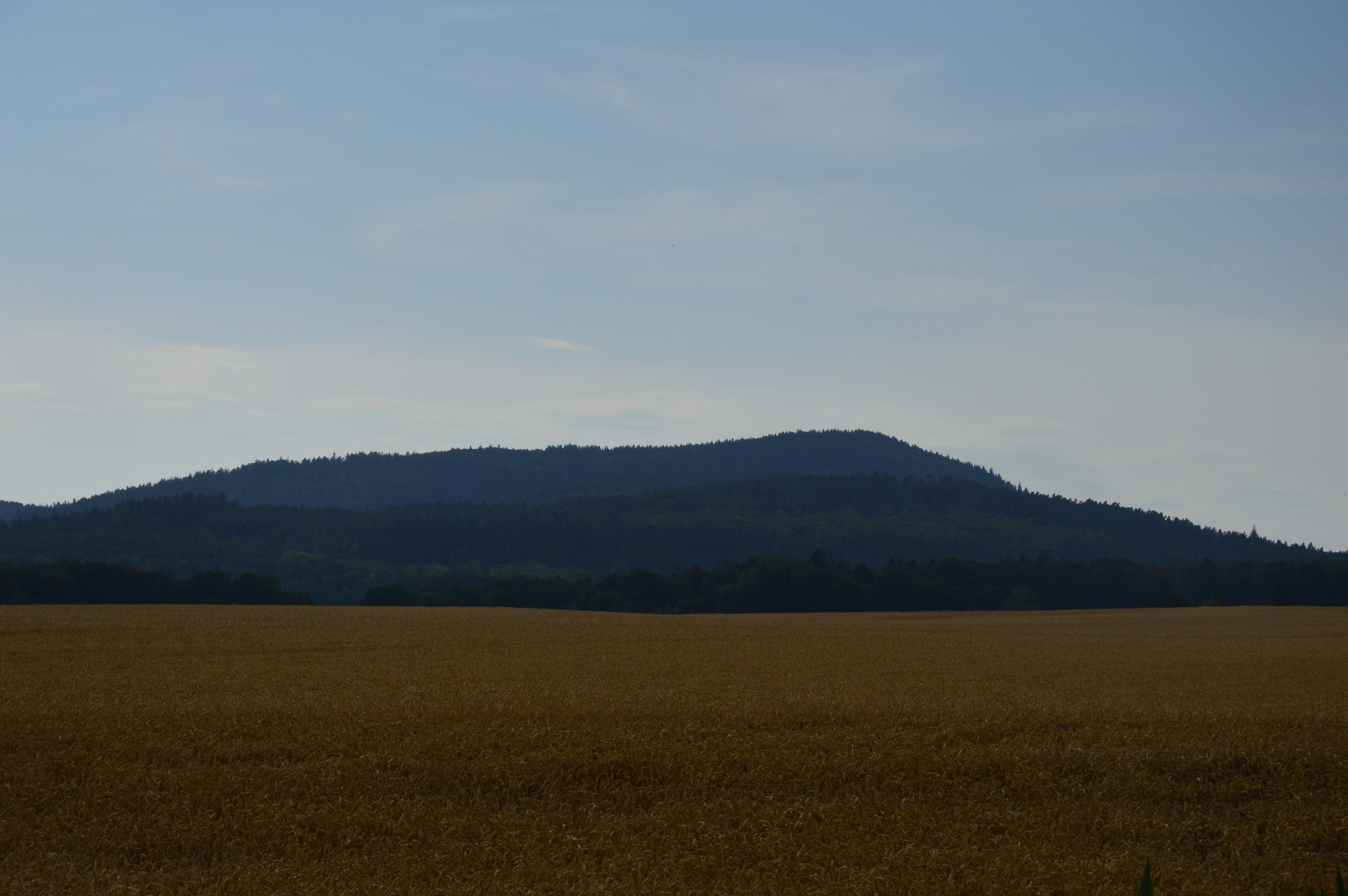
- Radunia.

Highest point
- Elevation: 573 m (1,880 ft)
- Coordinates: 50°50′14″N 16°42′39″E

Geography
- Location within Poland
- Location: Lower Silesian Voivodeship, Poland
- Parent range: Ślęża Massif

The Radunia (German: Geiersberg) is a hill in the Ślęża Massif. Its height is 573 metres above sea level. It lies in Góra Radunia Nature Reserve.

The hill is situated in Dzierżoniów County, Lower Silesian Voivodeship, in south-western Poland.
