= Boroviće =

Boroviće may refer to:

- Boroviće (Raška), village in Serbia
- Boroviće (Sjenica), village in Serbia
