= Pohoří (Rychnov nad Kněžnou District) =

- Municipality
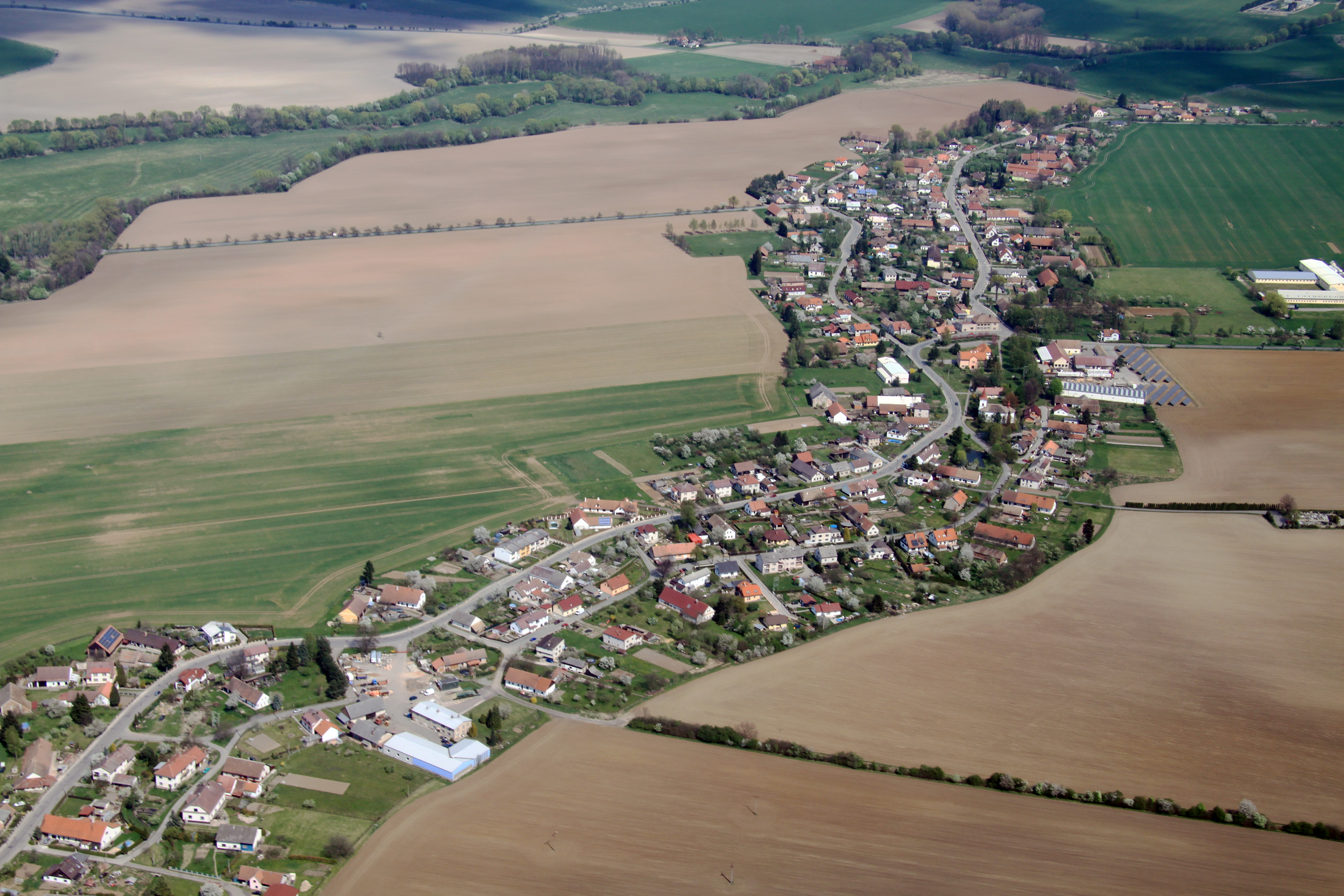
- Aerial view

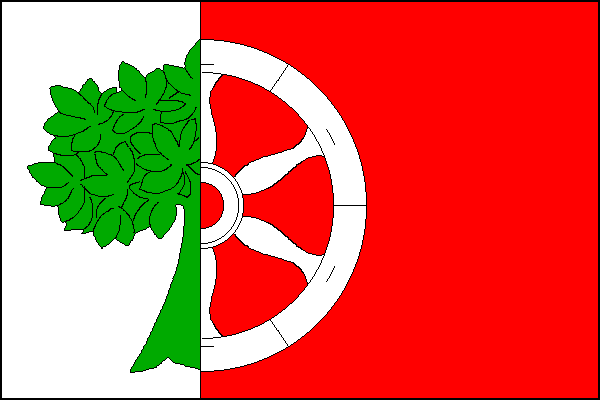
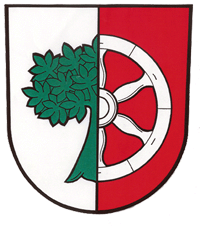
- Flag Coat of arms

- Location in the Czech Republic
- Coordinates: 50°17′32″N 16°5′57″E
- Country: Czech Republic
- Region: Hradec Králové
- District: Rychnov nad Kněžnou
- First mentioned: 1361

Area
  - Total: 6.29 km^{2} (2.43 sq mi)
- Elevation: 263 m (863 ft)

Population (2026-01-01)
  - Total: 681
  - Density: 108/km^{2} (280/sq mi)
- Time zone: UTC+1 (CET)
  - Summer (DST): UTC+2 (CEST)
- Postal code: 518 01
- Website: www.obecpohori.cz

Pohoří is a municipality and village in Rychnov nad Kněžnou District in the Hradec Králové Region of the Czech Republic. It has about 700 inhabitants.

== Demographics ==
Historical population
Year	Pop.	±%
1869	723	—
1880	787	+8.9%
1890	835	+6.1%
1900	772	−7.5%
1910	863	+11.8%
1921	817	−5.3%
1930	781	−4.4%
1950	585	−25.1%
1961	556	−5.0%
1970	528	−5.0%
1980	535	+1.3%
1991	548	+2.4%
2001	582	+6.2%
2011	648	+11.3%
2021	658	+1.5%
Source: Censuses

== Twin towns – sister cities ==
Pohoří is twinned with:

- Piława Górna, Poland
