= Borovica (disambiguation) =

Borovica (Serbian Cyrillic: Боровица) is a Serbo-Croatian toponym. It may refer to:

- Borovica, Bosnia and Herzegovina
- Borovica, Montenegro

== See also ==
- Borowica (disambiguation)
