= Mojsije =

Mojsije (Serbian Cyrillic: Мојсије, pronounced [mǒːjsije]) is a Serbian name, derived from Greek Mōÿsēs (Mωϋσῆς), a variant of the biblical name Moses. It may refer to:

- Mojsije I Rajović, Serbian Orthodox Patriarch 1712-1725
- Mojsije Putnik, Serbian Orthodox Metropolitan of Sremski Karlovci 1781-1790
- Mojsije Margel, Croatian rabbi
- Mojsije Dečanac, Serbian Orthodox monk and printer

== See also ==
- Musa (name)
