= Borowica, Lower Silesian Voivodeship =

Borowica
- Village
- Location within Poland
- Coordinates: 50°46′0″N 16°40′26″E
- Country: Poland
- Voivodeship: Lower Silesian
- County: Dzierżoniów
- Gmina: Dzierżoniów

Borowica [bɔrɔˈvʲit͡sa] is a village in the administrative district of Gmina Dzierżoniów, within Dzierżoniów County, Lower Silesian Voivodeship, in south-western Poland.
