= Dębowa Góra, Lower Silesian Voivodeship =

Dębowa Góra
- Village
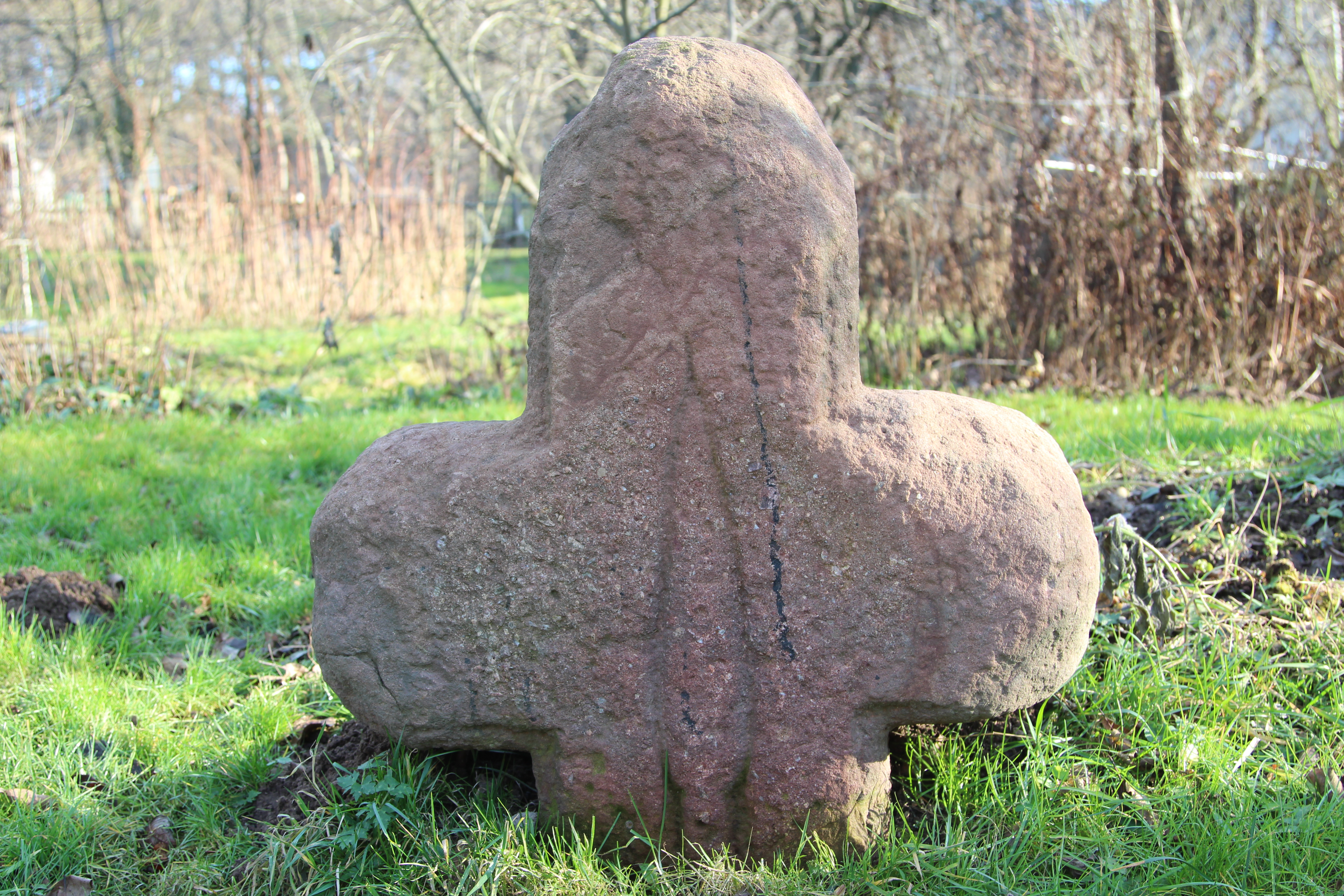
- Stone cross

- Location within Poland
- Coordinates: 50°46′07″N 16°44′01″E
- Country: Poland
- Voivodeship: Lower Silesian
- County: Dzierżoniów
- Gmina: Dzierżoniów

Dębowa Góra [dɛmˈbɔva ˈɡura] is a village in the administrative district of Gmina Dzierżoniów, within Dzierżoniów County, Lower Silesian Voivodeship, in south-western Poland.
