= Dobrocinek, Lower Silesian Voivodeship =

Dobrocinek
- Village
- Location within Poland
- Coordinates: 50°37′42″N 16°37′20″E
- Country: Poland
- Voivodeship: Lower Silesian
- County: Dzierżoniów
- Gmina: Dzierżoniów

Dobrocinek [dɔbrɔˈt͡ɕinɛk] is a village in the administrative district of Gmina Dzierżoniów, within Dzierżoniów County, Lower Silesian Voivodeship, in south-western Poland.
