= Tuszyn, Lower Silesian Voivodeship =

Tuszyn
- Village
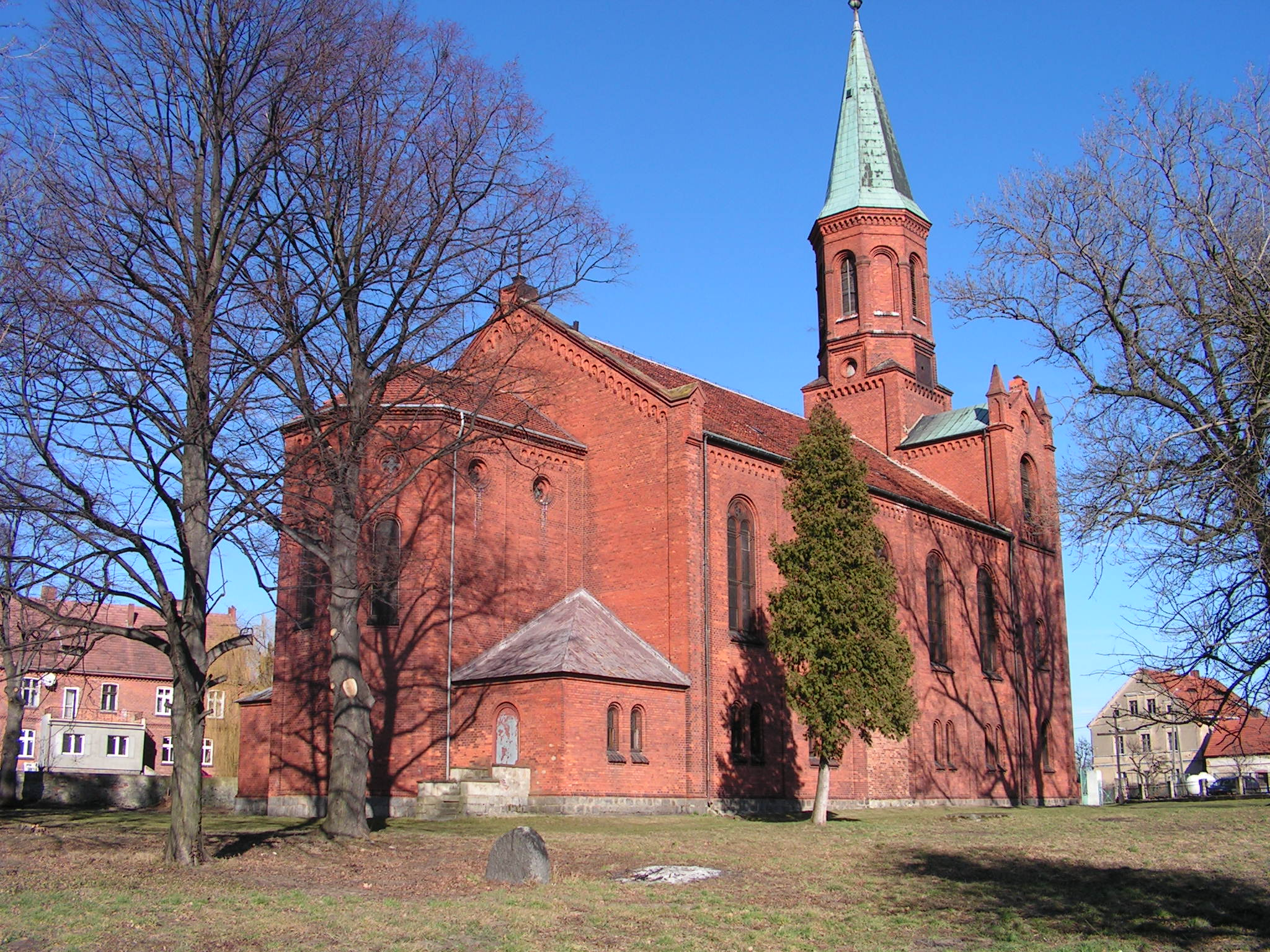

- Location within Poland
- Coordinates: 50°47′43″N 16°38′47″E
- Country: Poland
- Voivodeship: Lower Silesian
- County: Dzierżoniów
- Gmina: Dzierżoniów

Population
  - Total: 330
- Time zone: UTC+1 (CET)
  - Summer (DST): UTC+2 (CEST)
- Vehicle registration: DDZ

Tuszyn is a village within Dzierżoniów County, Lower Silesian Voivodeship, in south-western Poland.
