= Dobrocin, Lower Silesian Voivodeship =

Dobrocin
- Village
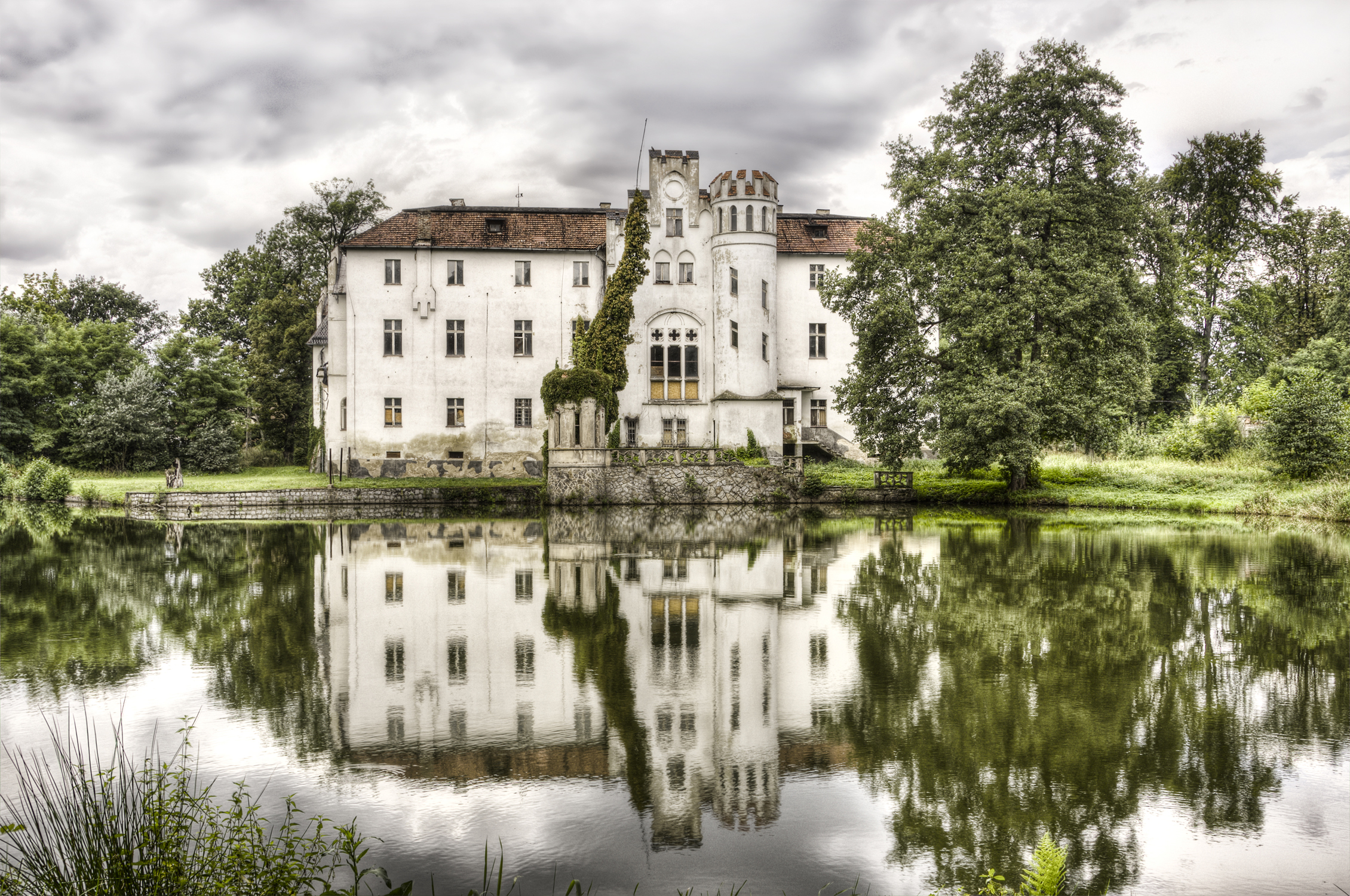
- 18th-century palace Pałac w Dobrocinie

- Location within Poland
- Coordinates: 50°43′54″N 16°42′06″E
- Country: Poland
- Voivodeship: Lower Silesian
- County: Dzierżoniów
- Gmina: Dzierżoniów
- Population: 800

Dobrocin [dɔˈbrɔt͡ɕin] is a village in the administrative district of Gmina Dzierżoniów, within Dzierżoniów County, Lower Silesian Voivodeship, in south-western Poland.
