= Borovnice (Trutnov District) =

- Municipality
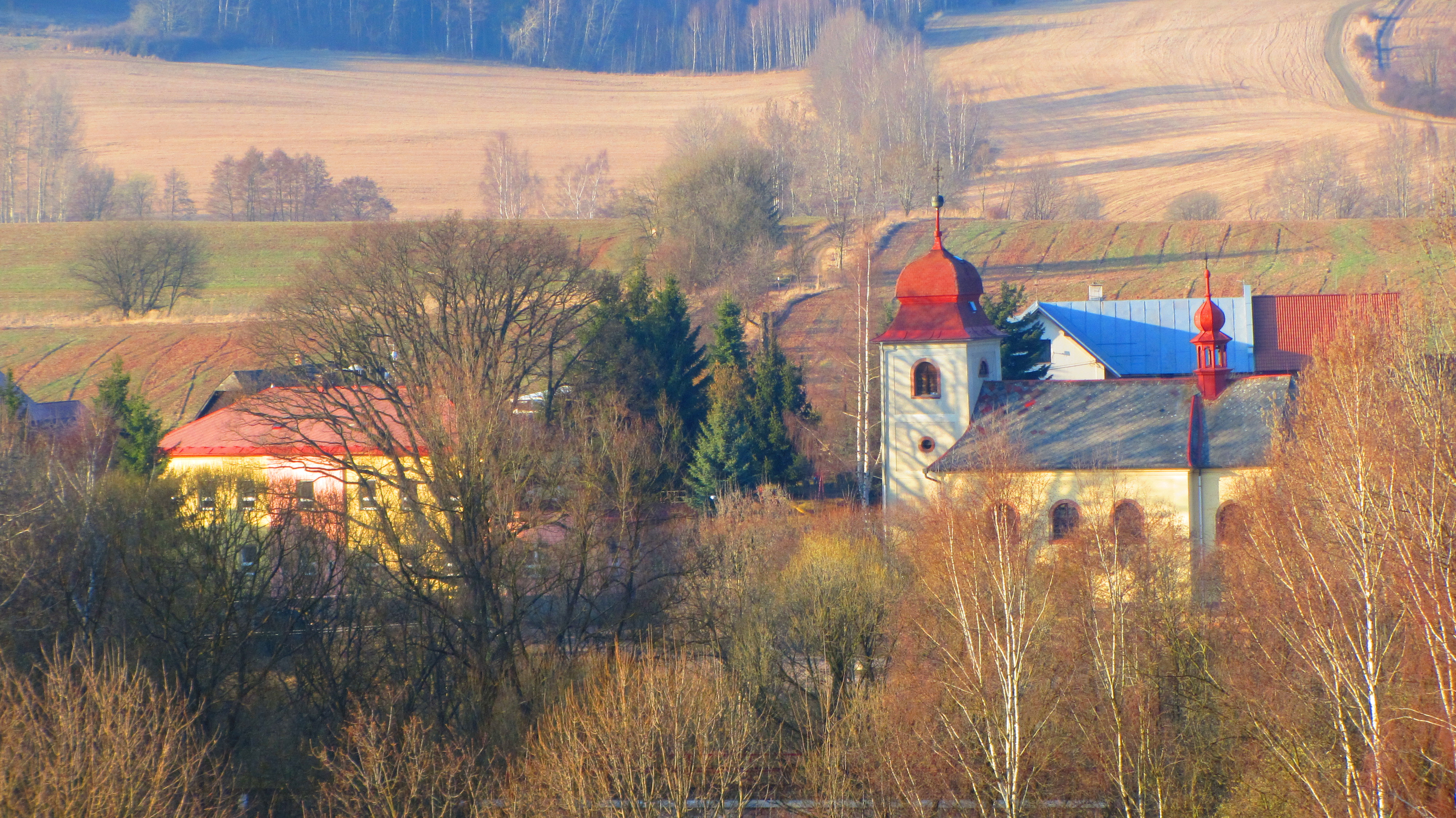
- Church of Saint Vitus

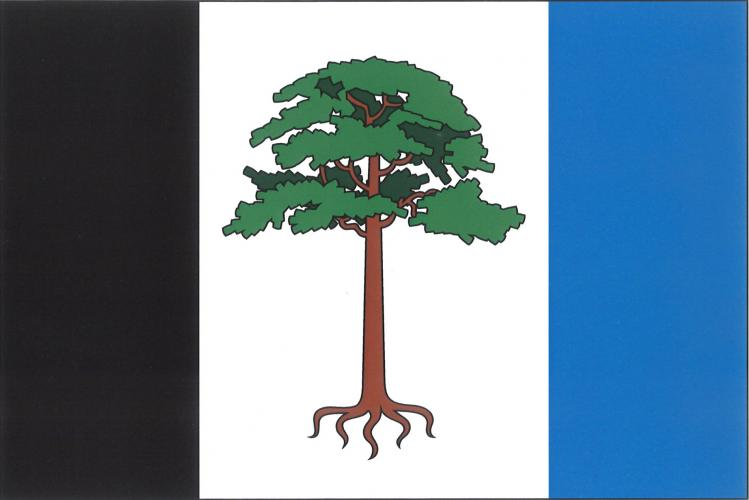
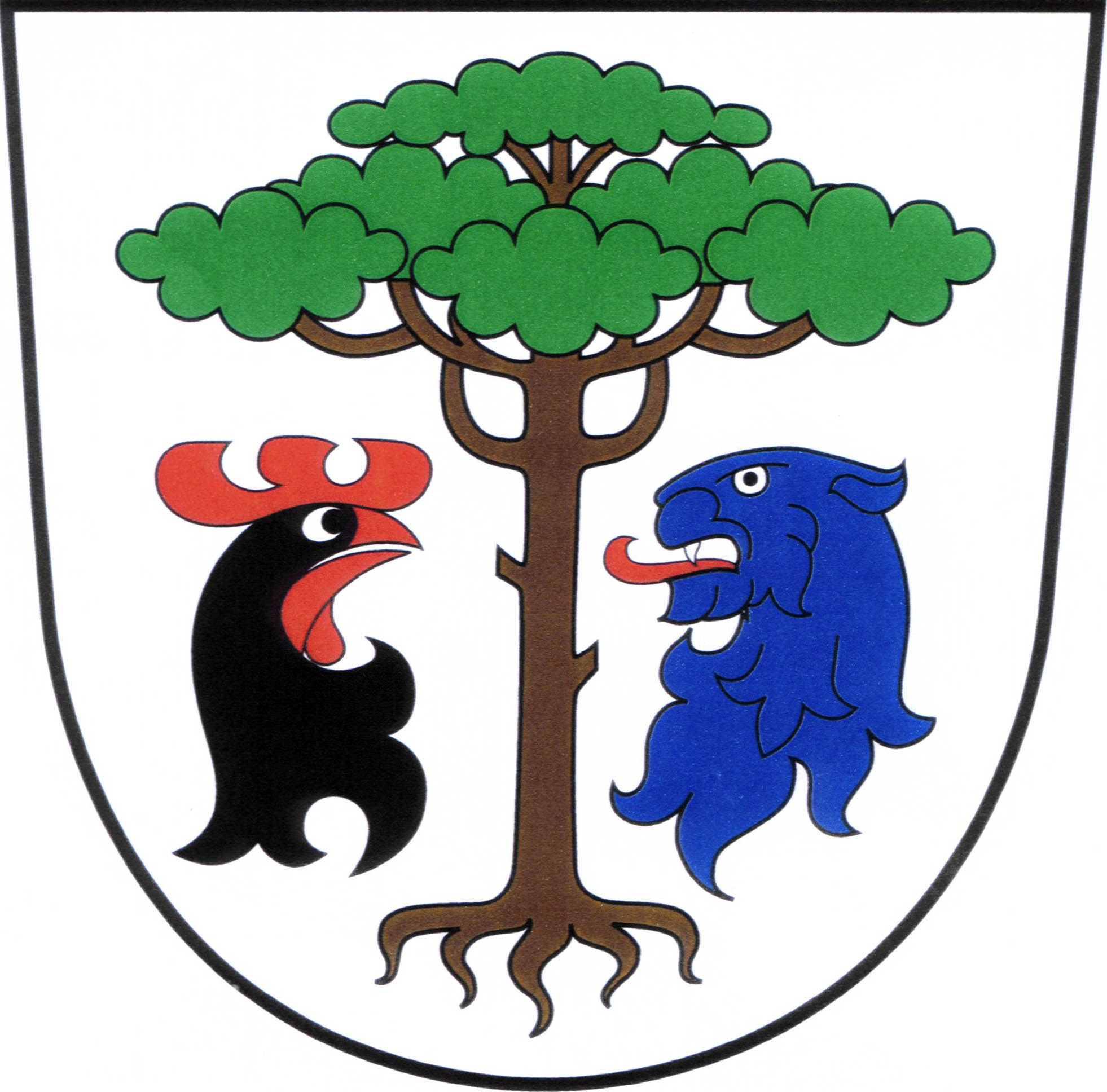
- Flag Coat of arms

- Location in the Czech Republic
- Coordinates: 50°30′33″N 15°37′2″E
- Country: Czech Republic
- Region: Hradec Králové
- District: Trutnov
- First mentioned: 1382

Area
  - Total: 9.77 km^{2} (3.77 sq mi)
- Elevation: 481 m (1,578 ft)

Population (2026-01-01)
  - Total: 371
  - Density: 38.0/km^{2} (98.4/sq mi)
- Time zone: UTC+1 (CET)
  - Summer (DST): UTC+2 (CEST)
- Postal code: 544 77
- Website: www.borovnice.cz

Borovnice (Czech pronunciation: [ˈborovɲɪtsɛ]; German: Groß Borowitz) is a municipality and village in Trutnov District in the Hradec Králové Region of the Czech Republic. It has about 400 inhabitants.

== Etymology ==
The name is derived from the Czech adjective borovná (which is derived from borovice, i.e. 'pine'). Borovnice was a common toponym for pine forests and streams flowing through pine forests, and from there it was transferred to settlements.

== Demographics ==
Historical population
Year	Pop.	±%
1869	1,443	—
1880	1,305	−9.6%
1890	1,356	+3.9%
1900	1,247	−8.0%
1910	1,210	−3.0%
1921	1,155	−4.5%
1930	1,181	+2.3%
1950	716	−39.4%
1961	723	+1.0%
1970	635	−12.2%
1980	555	−12.6%
1991	439	−20.9%
2001	445	+1.4%
2011	378	−15.1%
2021	342	−9.5%
Source: Censuses
