= Mojsije Margel =

Rabbi Mojsije Margel

Personal life
- Born: 13 November 1875 Mościsko, German Empire, (now Poland)
- Died: 30 April 1939 (aged 63) Zagreb, Kingdom of Yugoslavia, (now Croatia)
- Buried: Mirogoj Cemetery

Religious life
- Religion: Judaism
- Denomination: Orthodox Judaism

Jewish leader
- Successor: Rabbi Miroslav Šalom Freiberger
- Synagogue: Zagreb Synagogue
- Yeshiva: Jewish elementary school in Zagreb
- Began: 1927
- Ended: 1937
- Residence: Zagreb

Mojsije Margel (Croatian: Moše Margel; born 13 November 1875 in Mościsko, died 30 April 1939 in Zagreb) was rabbi of Zagreb, lexicographer, and Hebrew scholar.

== Early life ==
Margel attended a Talmud school. At the age of 15 Margel sent a poem in Hebrew to the Jewish magazine Ha-Maggid. Upon successful completion of Talmud school, Margel began his Jewish theological seminary studies in Vienna and Berlin. Margel finished successfully the Jewish philosophy subject in Berlin and Bern. In Kraków Margel published Hebrew magazine Ocar Hasifrut around which he gathered the best associates, and the most prominent Hebrew writers and philologists of the time.

== Religious life ==
As a rabbi Margel was first active in the Slovak town of Ružomberok. In 1903 he took over the service as a rabbi and Jewish religious teacher in the Croatian town of Požega. In 1908 he became a member of the Jewish Rabbis committee. During World War I Margel took over the pastoral care of Military Rabbinate in Zagreb and Italy. In 1919 Margel was appointed as a director of the Zagreb Jewish elementary school. From 1927 until 1937, in the Kingdom of Yugoslavia, Margel was rabbi of the Jewish community in Zagreb. Due to s health problems Margel retired in 1937 as a community rabbi. His brother Juda Margel, was the rabbi of the Nova Gradiška Jewish Community.

== Scientific and publisher activities ==
Margel's scientific activities were primarily connected with the Hebrew language, especially the Hebrew literature and lexicography. He was valued for his expertise in the Kingdom of Yugoslavia. In Požega, in 1906, he wrote and published the German-Hebrew dictionary. Margel wrote many articles and studies that were published in the Jewish press and has written articles for capital edition of The Jewish Encyclopedia in New York City. He was the editor of the Jewish almanac from 1925 until 1930, which was published under Rabbinate of the State of Slovenes, Croats and Serbs. Margel was considered as a late member of the Haskala movement in Europe.

== Death ==
Margel died on 30 April 1939 in Zagreb and was buried at the Mirogoj Cemetery. The Margel Institute in Zagreb was named after him.

== Bibliography ==
- Snješka Knežević, Aleksander Laslo (2011). Židovski Zagreb. Zagreb: AGM, Židovska općina Zagreb. ISBN 978-953-174-393-8.
