= Piława Górna =

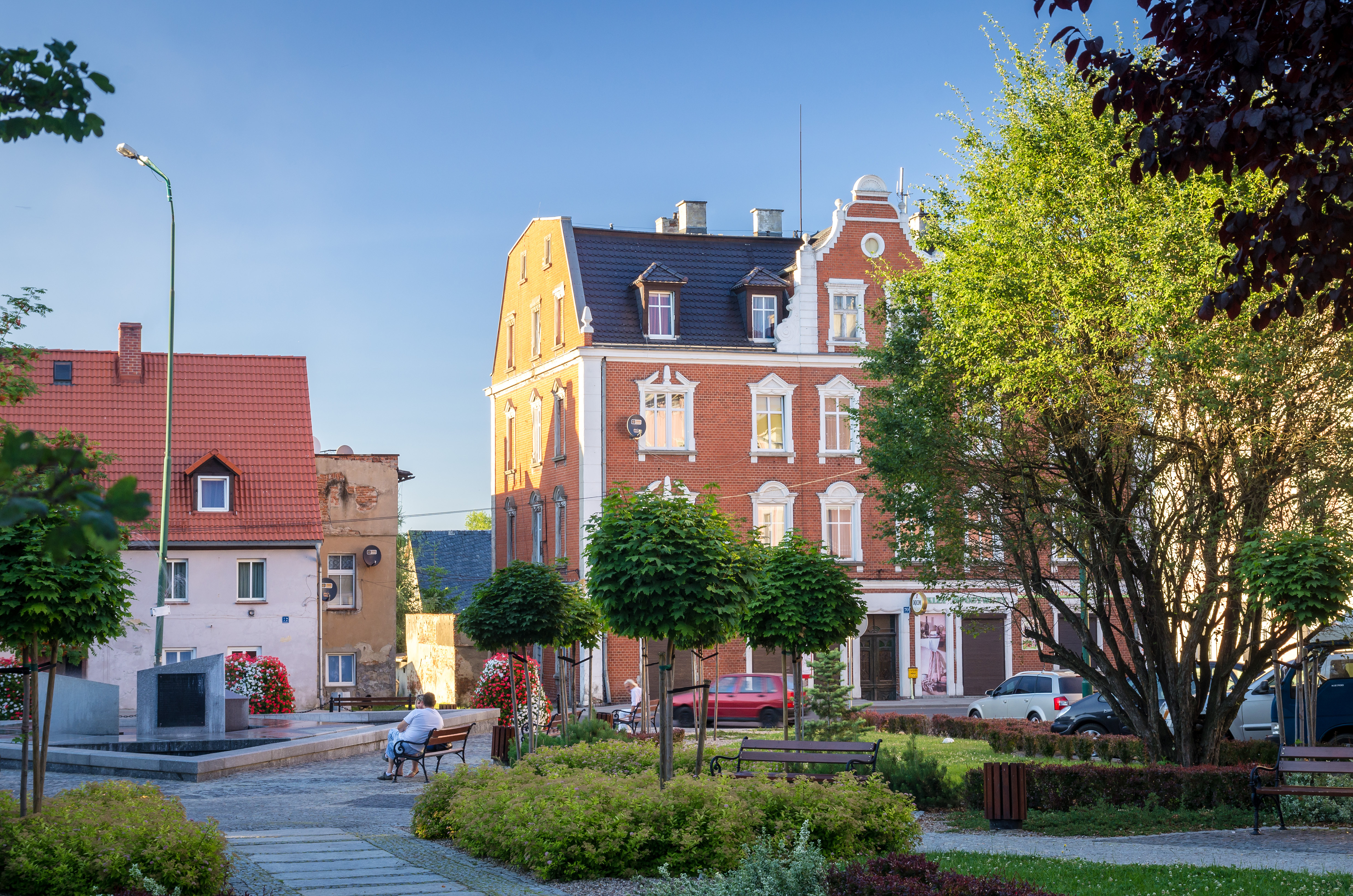

- Flag Coat of arms

- Location within Poland
- Coordinates: 50°41′N 16°45′E
- Country: Poland
- Voivodeship: Lower Silesian
- County: Dzierżoniów
- Gmina: Piława Górna (urban gmina)
- Town rights: 1962

Government
  - Mayor: Krzysztof Chudyk

Area
  - Total: 20.93 km^{2} (8.08 sq mi)

Population (2019-06-30)
  - Total: 6,412
  - Density: 306.4/km^{2} (793.5/sq mi)
- Time zone: UTC+1 (CET)
  - Summer (DST): UTC+2 (CEST)
- Area code: +48 74
- Vehicle registration: DDZ
- Website: http://www.pilawagorna.pl

Piława Górna [pʲiˈwava ˈɡurna] is a town in Dzierżoniów County, Lower Silesian Voivodeship, in south-western Poland, in the western part of the Wzgórza Strzelińskie hills.

According to official figures for 2019, the town has a population of 6,412.

== History ==
The oldest historic mention of Piława Górna comes from the 12th century under the Latin name Pilava Superius. Piława Górna was part of Piast-ruled Poland. In 1189, Bishop of Wrocław Żyrosław II granted Piława to the Knights Hospitaller from Strzegom. After Polish rule, Piława Górna passed under the suzerainty of the Kingdom of Bohemia, Hungary, again Bohemia and the Habsburg monarchy. It was an agricultural village in Lower Silesia.

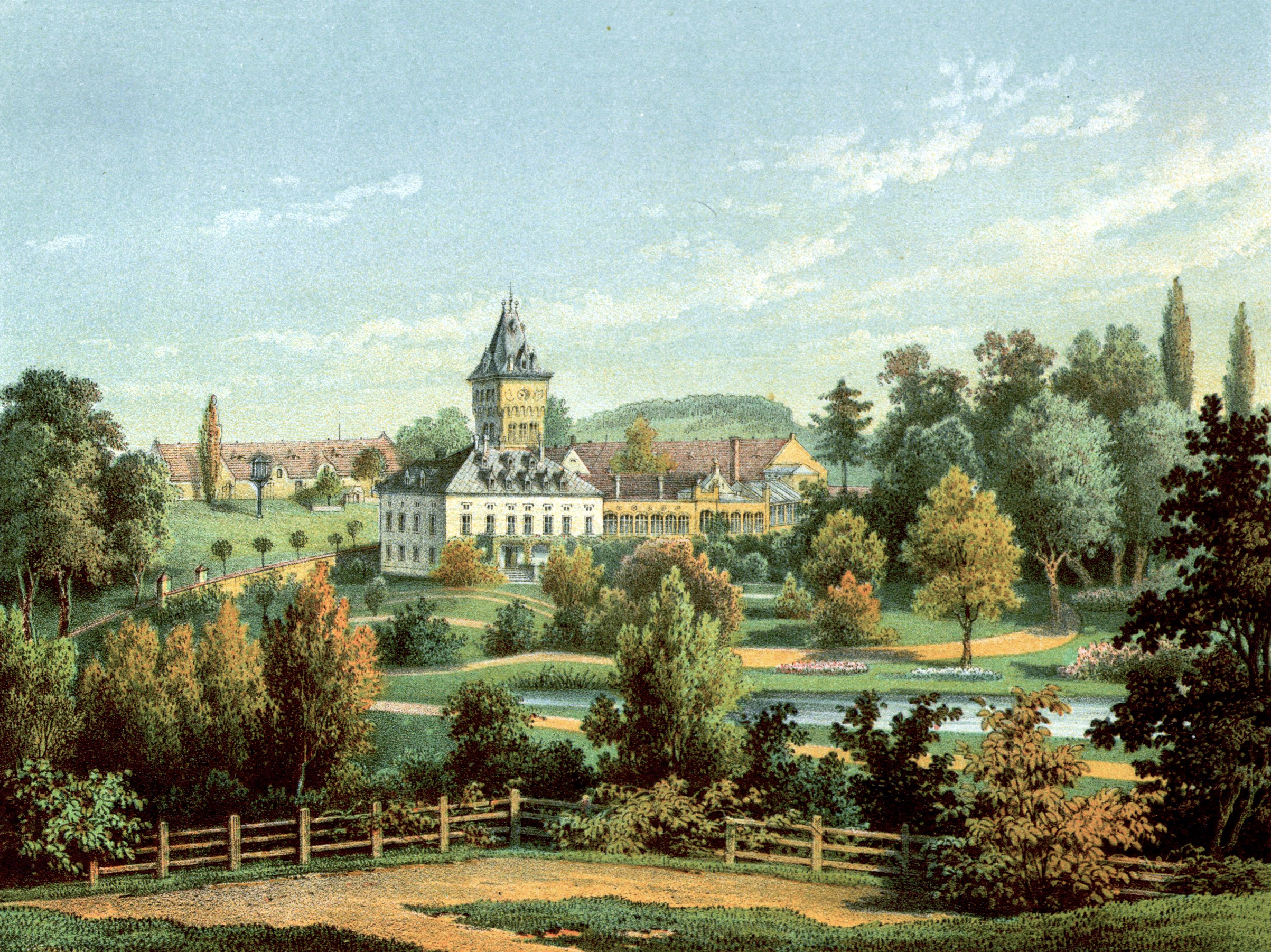
19th-century view of the palace

After its annexation by the Kingdom of Prussia from Austria in the First Silesian War, German settlers developed a clothing industry in the village in 1743. A settlement congregation of the Moravian Brethren was built in Piława Górna, then officially known under the Germanized name Ober-Peilau, on the estate of the Austrian noble Ernst Julius, Count von Seydlitz. Imprisoned for his Protestant faith by the Habsburg rulers of Silesia, when he was freed following the Prussian seizure of Silesia, he named the new settlement Gnadenfrei ("freed by [God's] Grace") to commemorate the event. Later on Gnadenfrei would be merged with Piława Górna. In 1842, Piława Górna had a population of 713. From 1871 to 1945 Peilau/Piława was part of Germany. It was for many years "the longest village in Germany", stretching for several miles along the Piława/Peila stream.

By the beginning of the 20th century the village was almost completely German in ethnicity and Protestant in confession. During World War I, the German administration operated a POW camp for Allied officers and a forced labour camp for regular POWs in the town. In 1928, it was renamed Gnadenfrei in attempt to erase traces of Polish origin. During World War II, the Germans operated a forced labour camp for Jewish men. Following the defeat of Germany in the war, the settlement became again part of Poland, although with a Soviet-installed communist regime, which stayed in power until the 1980s. The remaining German population was expelled in accordance with the Potsdam Agreement and replaced with Roman Catholic Poles, themselves having been expelled from the Lwów (Lviv) region (now in Ukraine).

In 1962 Piława Górna was granted town privileges. From 1975 to 1998 Piława Górna was administratively located in Wałbrzych Voivodeship.

== Sights ==
Architectural sights include: the Saint Martin church (built in the 16th–19th centuries), an 18th-century palace complex and the Educational Centre building from the 19th century.

== Economy ==
Weaving mills and quarries were located in the vicinity of Piława Górna by the 14th century; the former state textile firm and quarry still exists in the town. In 2002 Piława Górna had 120 stone-working businesses, 27 textile businesses of various kinds, 172 trade companies, and 157 service industries. The agricultural industry is based on local farming and consists of 115 small businesses which mostly grow sugar beets, rapeseed, and grains.

In order to promote tourism in the region, Piława Górna engages in agritourism.

== Twin towns – sister cities ==
Piława Górna is twinned with:

- Airaines, France
- Dobruška, Czech Republic
- Kriftel, Germany
- Pohoří, Czech Republic

== Gallery ==
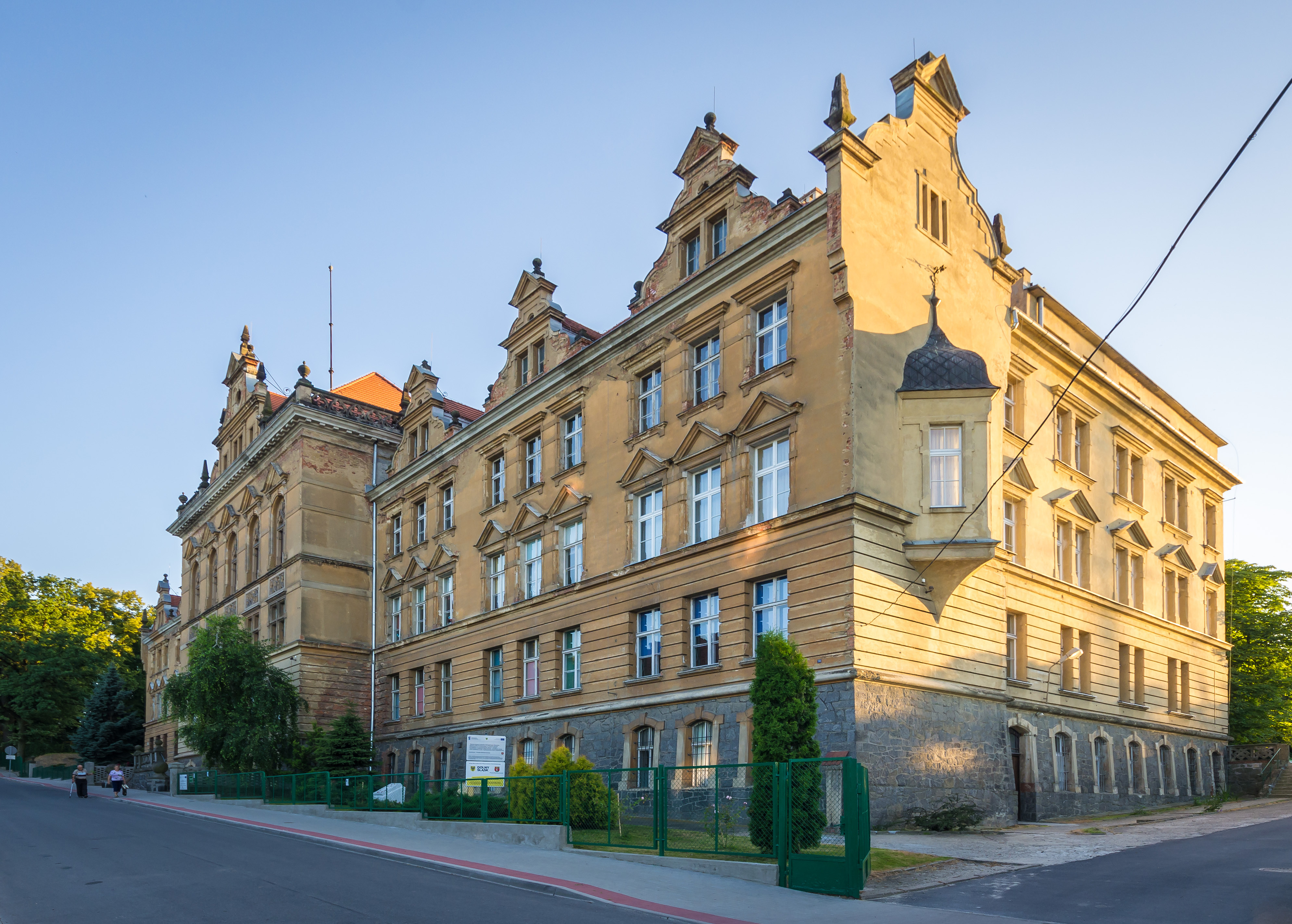
Educational Centre

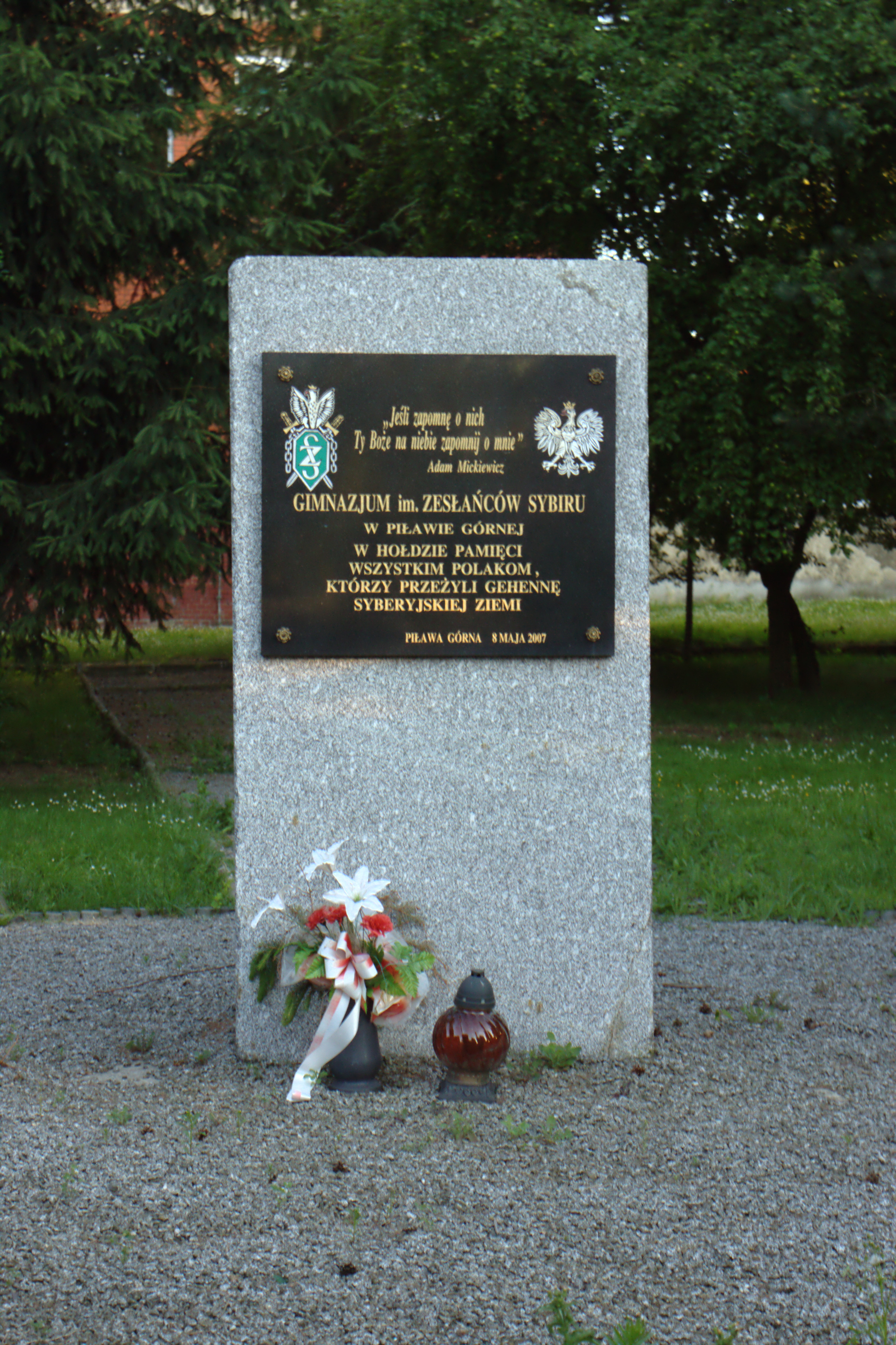
Monument commemorating Poles deported to Siberia

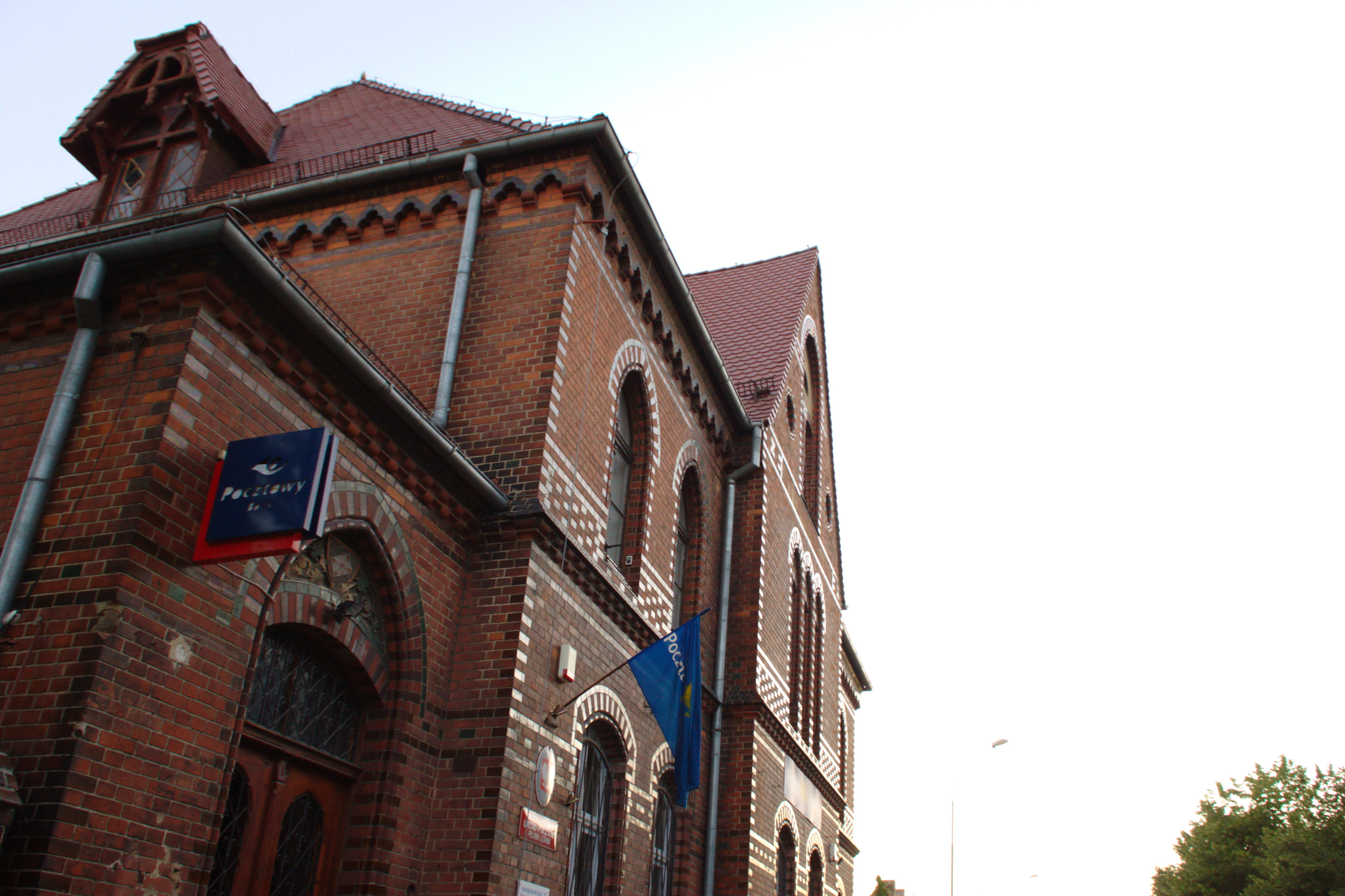
Post office

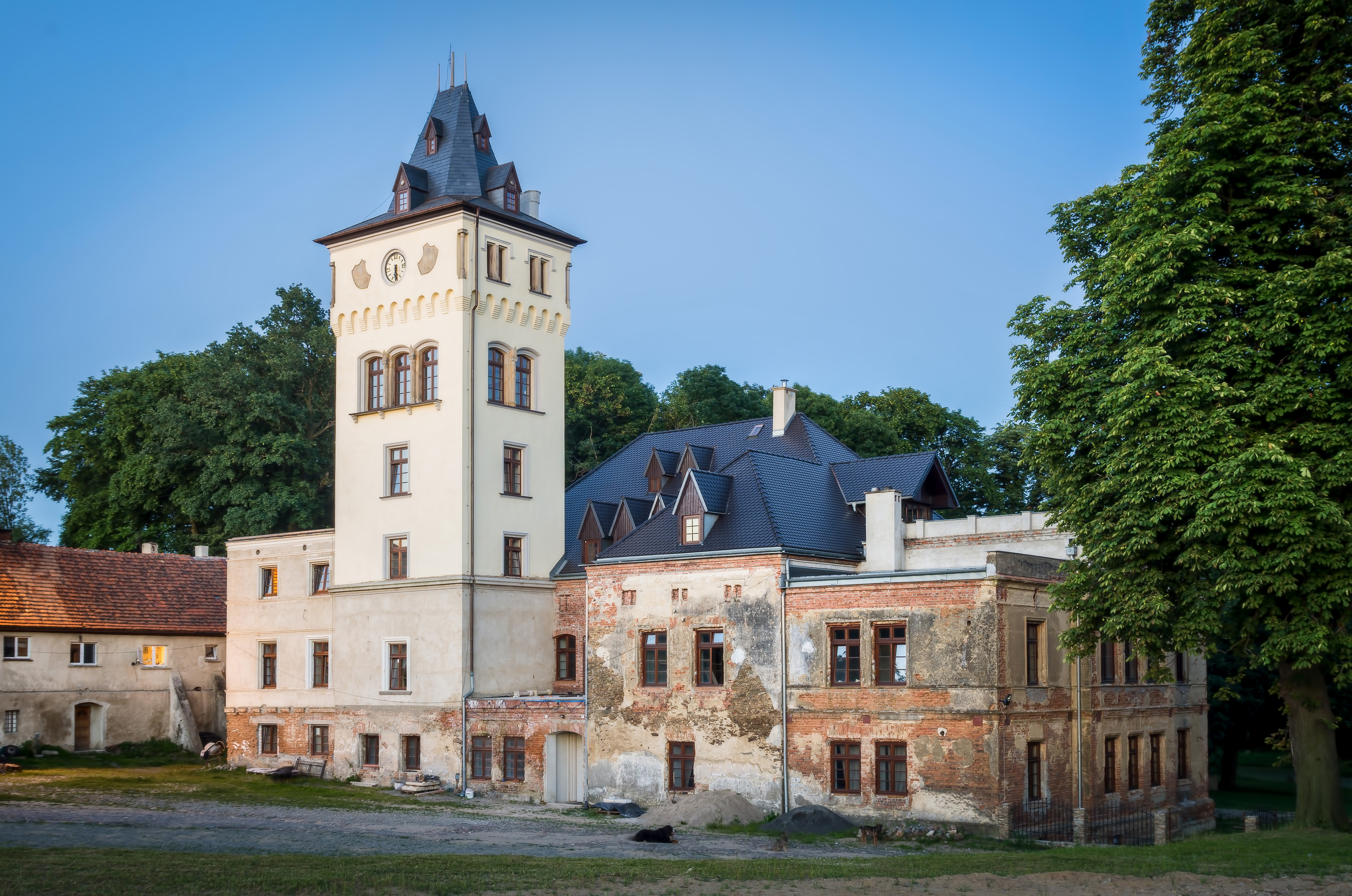
Palace
