= Dzierżoniów County =

Coordinates: 50°43′N 16°33′E

Dzierżoniów County Powiat dzierżoniowski
- County
- Flag Coat of arms

- Location within the voivodeship
- Country: Poland
- Voivodeship: Lower Silesian
- Seat: Dzierżoniów
- Gminas: Total 7 (incl. 4 urban): Bielawa; Dzierżoniów; Gmina Pieszyce; Piława Górna; Gmina Dzierżoniów; Gmina Łagiewniki; Gmina Niemcza

Area
  - Total: 478.3 km^{2} (184.7 sq mi)

Population (2019-06-30)
  - Total: 101,118
  - Density: 211.4/km^{2} (547.6/sq mi)
  - Urban: 79,710
  - Rural: 21,408
- Car plates: DDZ
- Website: www.pow.dzierzoniow.pl

Dzierżoniów County (Polish: powiat dzierżoniowski) is a unit of territorial administration and local government (powiat) in Lower Silesian Voivodeship, south-western Poland. It came into being on January 1, 1999, as a result of the Polish local government reforms passed in 1998. Its administrative seat is the town of Dzierżoniów, and it also contains four other towns: Bielawa, Niemcza, Pieszyce and Piława Górna. The county covers an area of 478.3 square kilometres (184.7 sq mi).

As at 2019 the total population of the county is 101,118. This figure breaks down as follows: Dzierżoniów 33,239, Bielawa 29,971, Pieszyce 7,123, Piława Górna 6,412, Niemcza 2,965, rural areas 21,408.

== Neighbouring counties ==
Dzierżoniów County is bordered by Świdnica County to the north, Wrocław County to the north-east, Strzelin County to the east, Ząbkowice County to the south-east, Kłodzko County to the south and Wałbrzych County to the west.

== Administrative divisions ==
The county is subdivided into seven gminas (three urban, two urban-rural and two rural). These are listed in the following table, in descending order of population.

| Gmina | Type | Area (km^{2}) | Population (2019) | Seat |
|---|---|---|---|---|
| Dzierżoniów | urban | 20.1 | 33,239 | |
| Bielawa | urban | 36.2 | 29,971 | |
| Gmina Pieszyce | urban-rural | 63.6 | 9,466 | Pieszyce |
| Gmina Dzierżoniów | rural | 142.1 | 9,114 | Dzierżoniów* |
| Gmina Łagiewniki | rural | 124.4 | 7,443 | Łagiewniki |
| Piława Górna | urban | 20.9 | 6,412 | |
| Gmina Niemcza | urban-rural | 72.1 | 5,473 | Niemcza |
* seat not part of the gmina

== The highest peaks ==
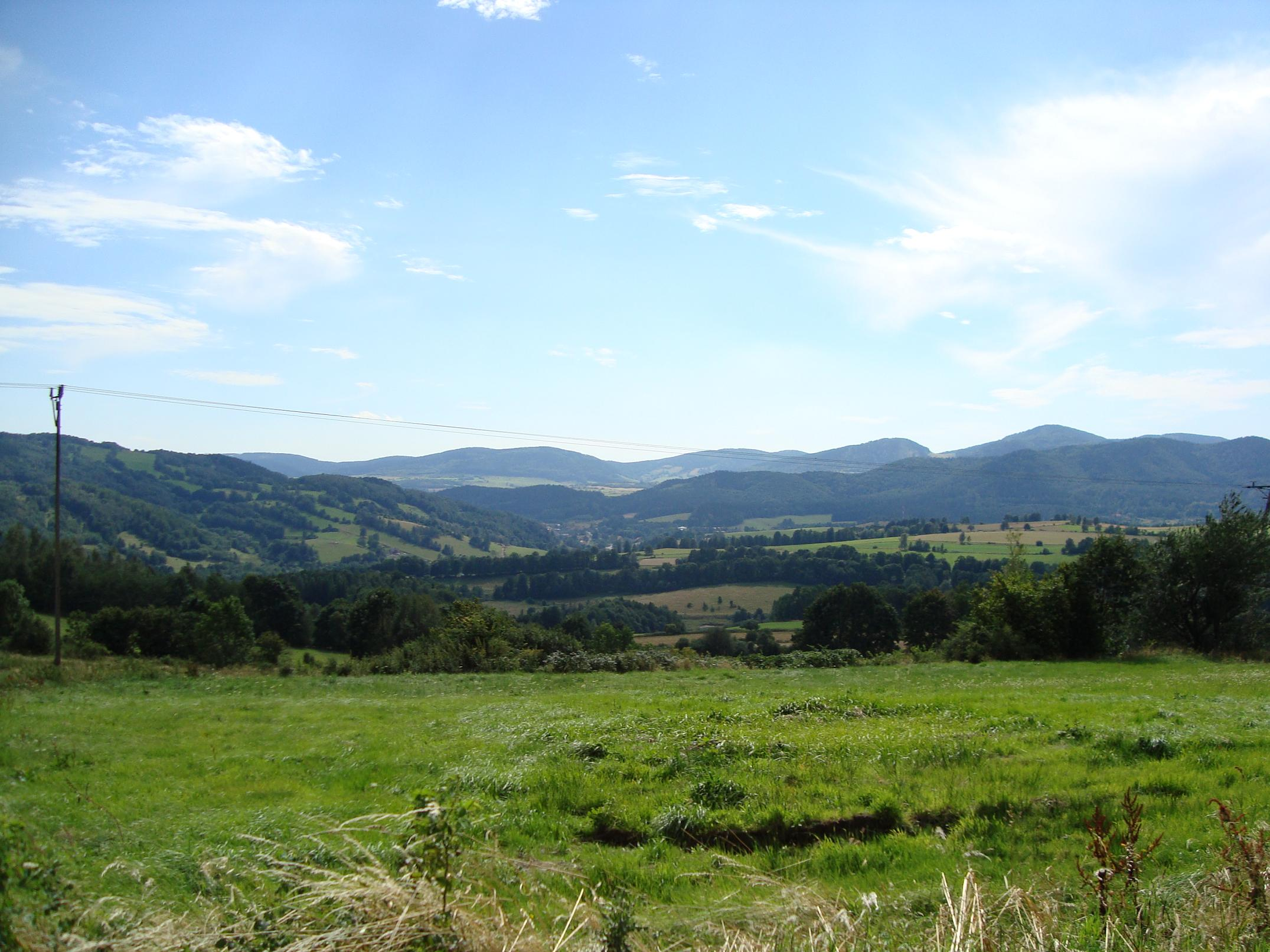
Owl Mountains

- Wielka Sowa – 1015 m
- Kalenica – 964 m
- Wilczyna – 665 m
- Kuczaba – 654 m
- Radunia (Ślęża Masiff) – 578 m
