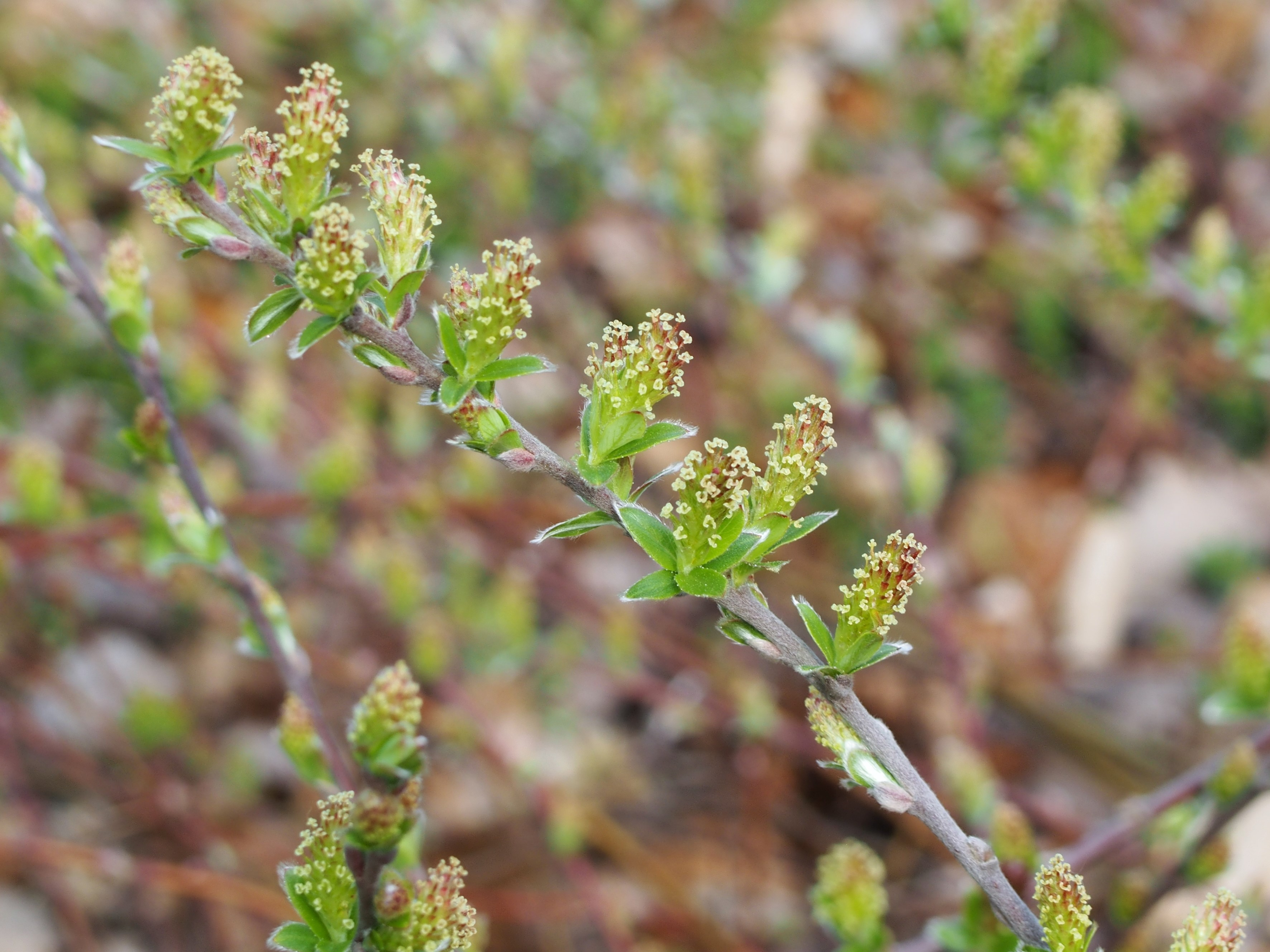
- At the University of Wrocław Botanical Garden
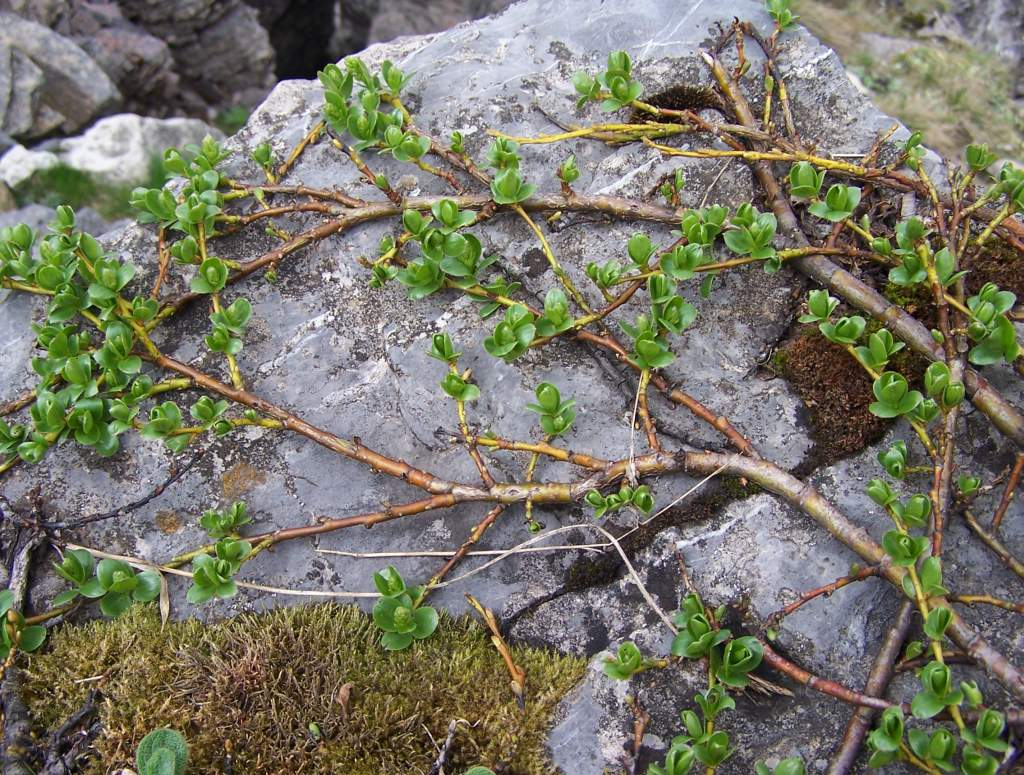
- Creeping habit in the Tatras

Scientific classification
- Kingdom: Plantae
- Clade: Tracheophytes
- Clade: Angiosperms
- Clade: Eudicots
- Clade: Rosids
- Order: Malpighiales
- Family: Salicaceae
- Genus: Salix
- Species: S. alpina

Binomial name
- Salix alpina Scop.

Synonyms
- Salix jacquiniana Willd.; Salix jacquinii Host

= Salix alpina =

Species of plant in the willow family

Salix alpina, the Alpine willow, is a species of flowering plant in the family Salicaceae, native to the Eastern Alps and the Carpatians, with one station in the Dinaric Alps. A creeping, mat-forming deciduous shrub, it is available in commerce. Its growth habit varies according to local conditions.
