= Ruszkowice =

Ruszkowice may refer to the following places in Poland:

- Ruszkowice, Lower Silesian Voivodeship (south-west Poland)
- Ruszkowice, Masovian Voivodeship (east-central Poland)
