= Gilów =

Gilów may refer to the following places in Poland:

- Gilów, Lower Silesian Voivodeship (south-west Poland)
- Gilów, Lublin Voivodeship (east Poland)
- Gilów, Świętokrzyskie Voivodeship (south-central Poland)
- Gilów, Lubusz Voivodeship (west Poland)
