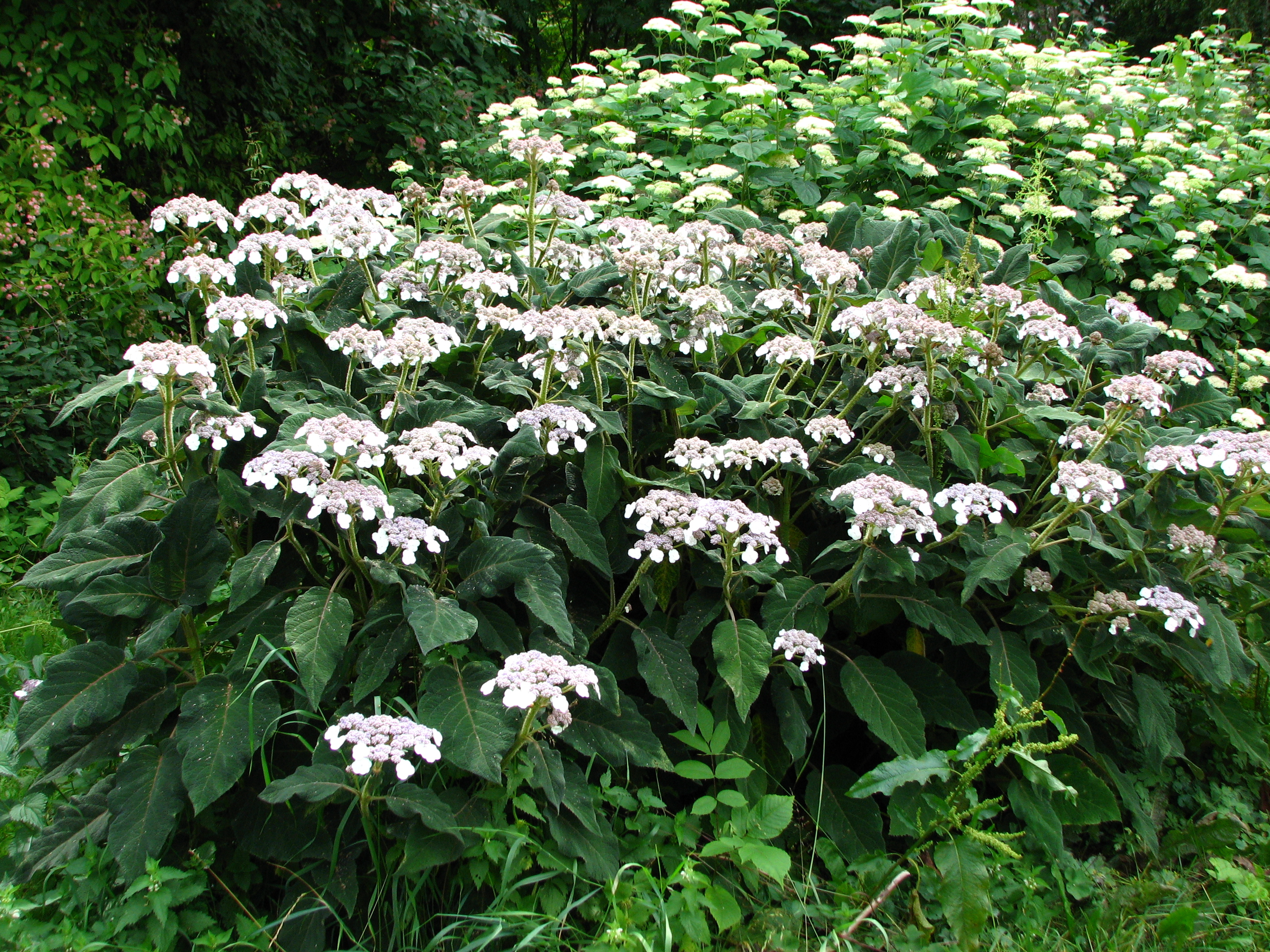
- Hydrangea sargentiana in the arboretum of the main botanical garden of the Russian Academy of Sciences
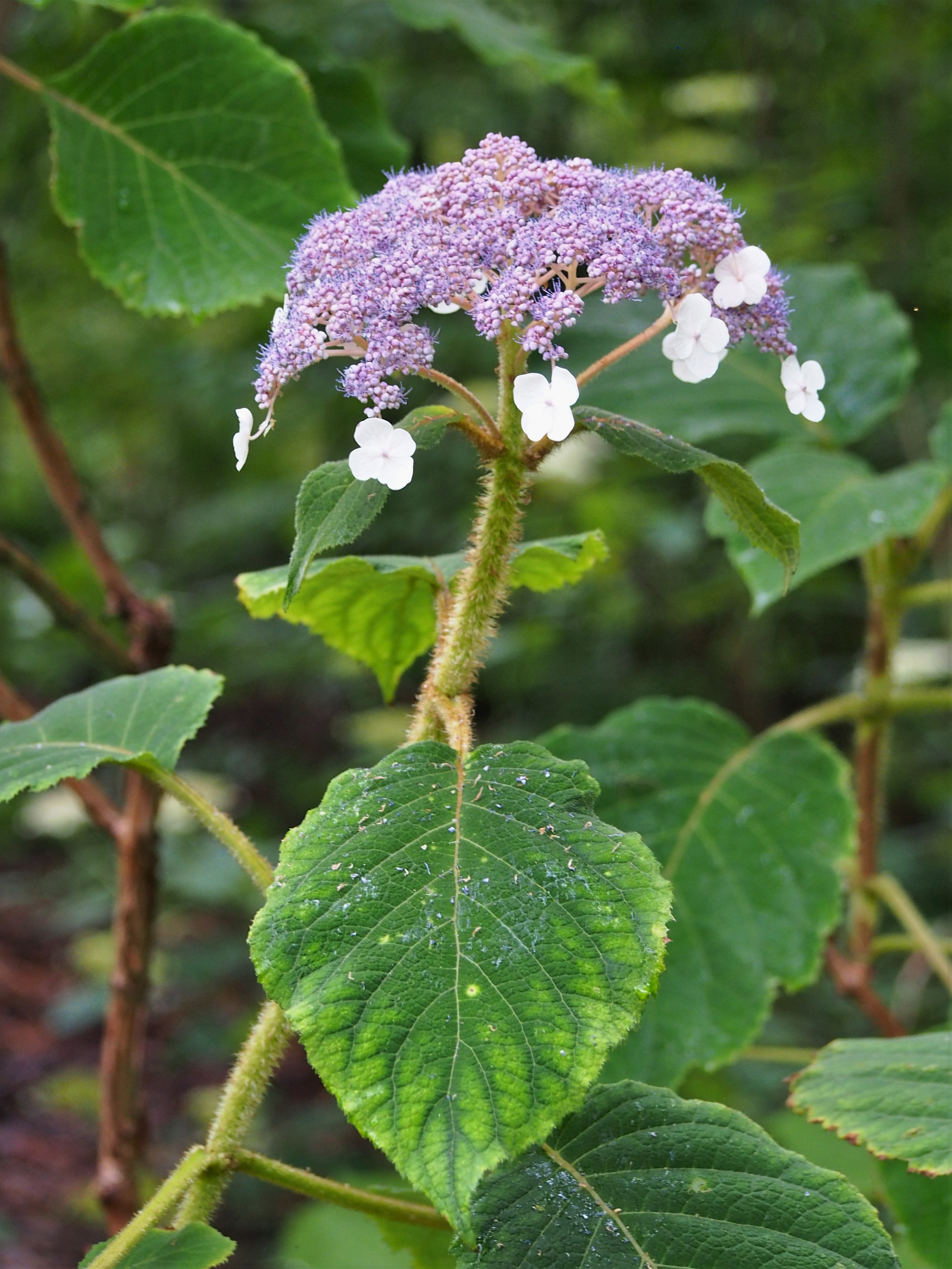
- A flowering specimen cultivated in Wrocław University Botanical Garden

Scientific classification
- Kingdom: Plantae
- Clade: Tracheophytes
- Clade: Angiosperms
- Clade: Eudicots
- Clade: Asterids
- Order: Cornales
- Family: Hydrangeaceae
- Genus: Hydrangea
- Species: H. sargentiana

Binomial name
- Hydrangea sargentiana Rehder

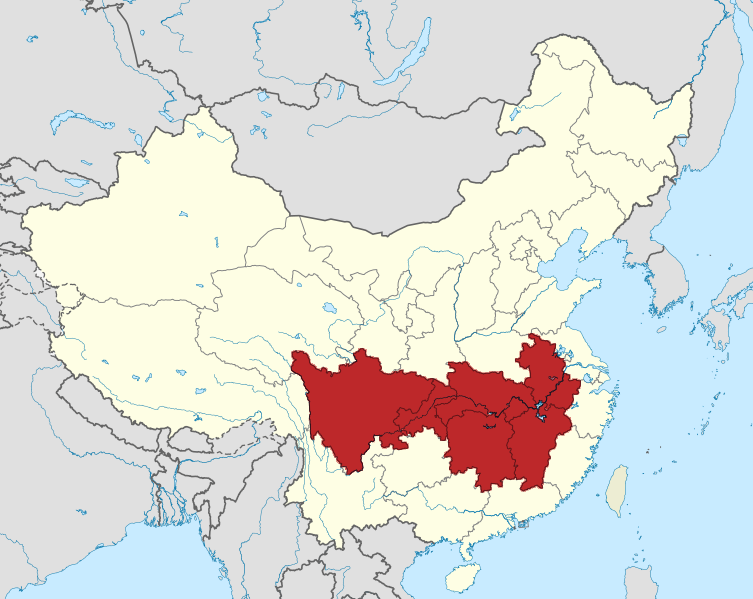
- Approximate distribution of Hydrangea sargentiana in South Central China

Synonyms
- Hydrangea aspera subsp. sargentiana (Rehder) E.M.McClint.

= Hydrangea sargentiana =

Species of flowering plant

Hydrangea sargentiana is a species of flowering plant in the family Hydrangeaceae. It is native to western China.

== Description ==
This species is a shrub. It has prominent fleshy trichomes on the leaf and shoot surfaces, which are an important feature in identifying the species.

== Taxonomy ==
It may be confused with Hydrangea robusta Hook.f. & Thomson, which also has similar fleshy trichomes. Both species are placed within Hydrangea section Asperae.

== Conservation ==
The distribution is thought to be very narrow.

== Gallery ==
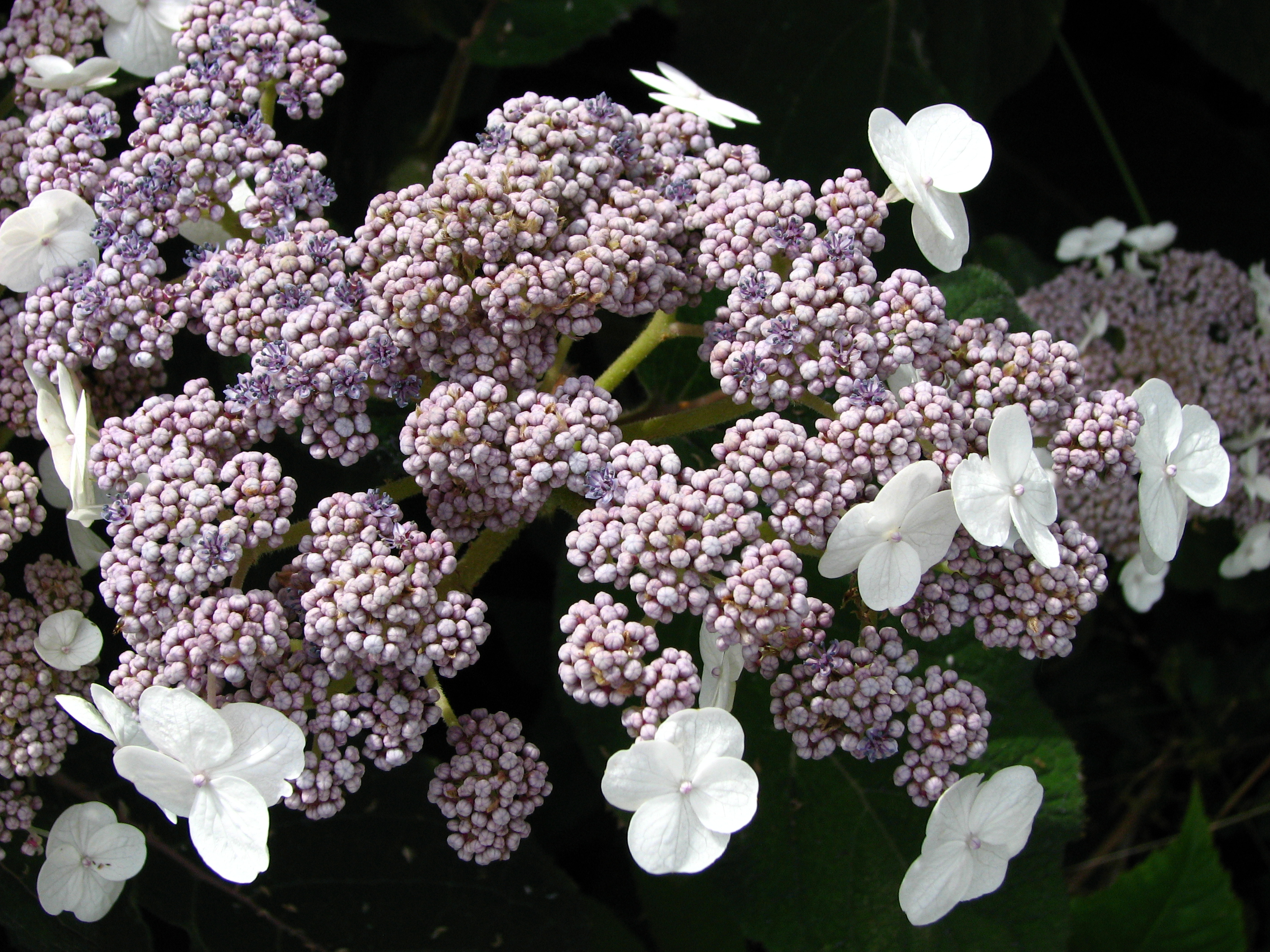
Detail of the inflorescence

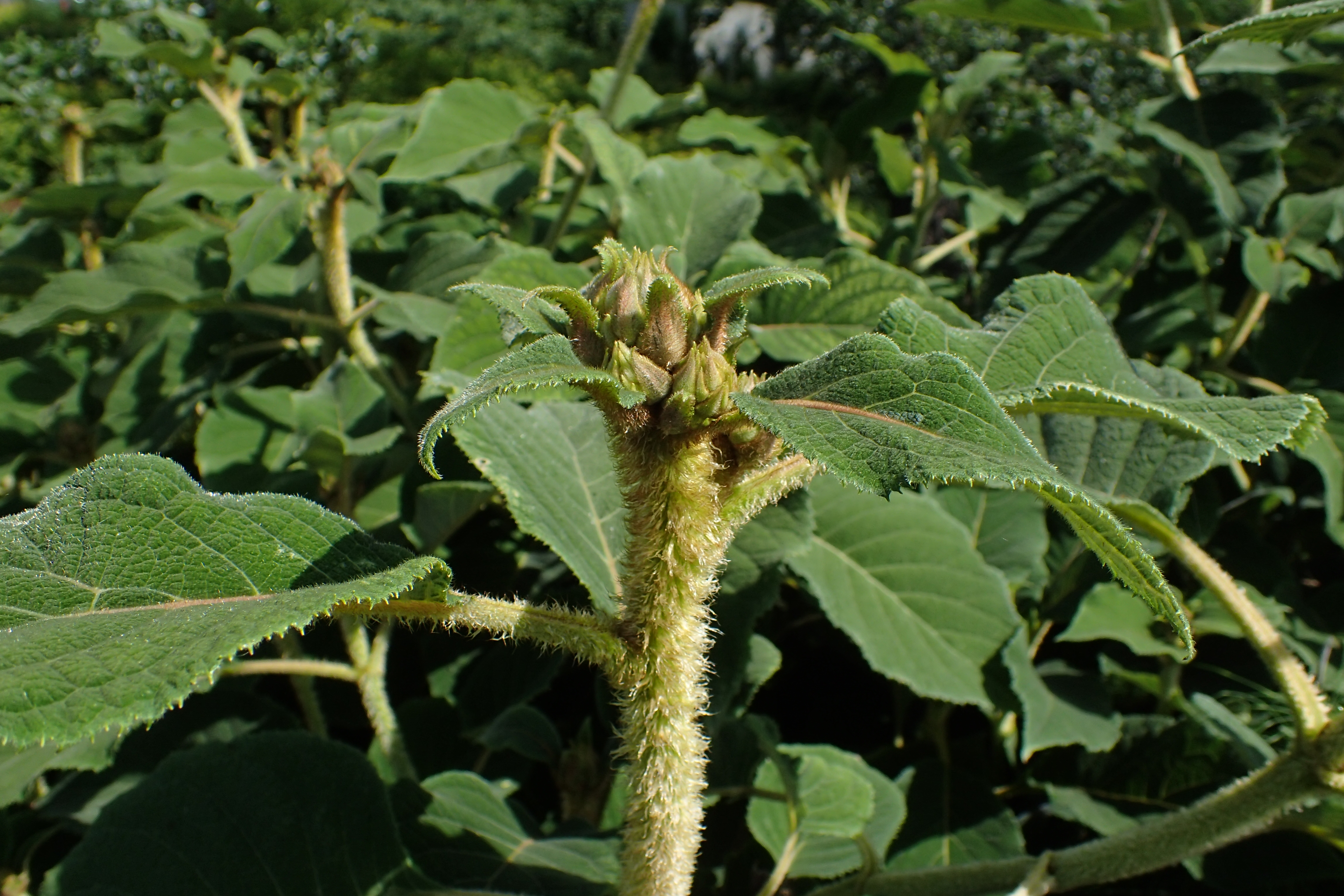
Close view of a shoot densely covered in trichomes

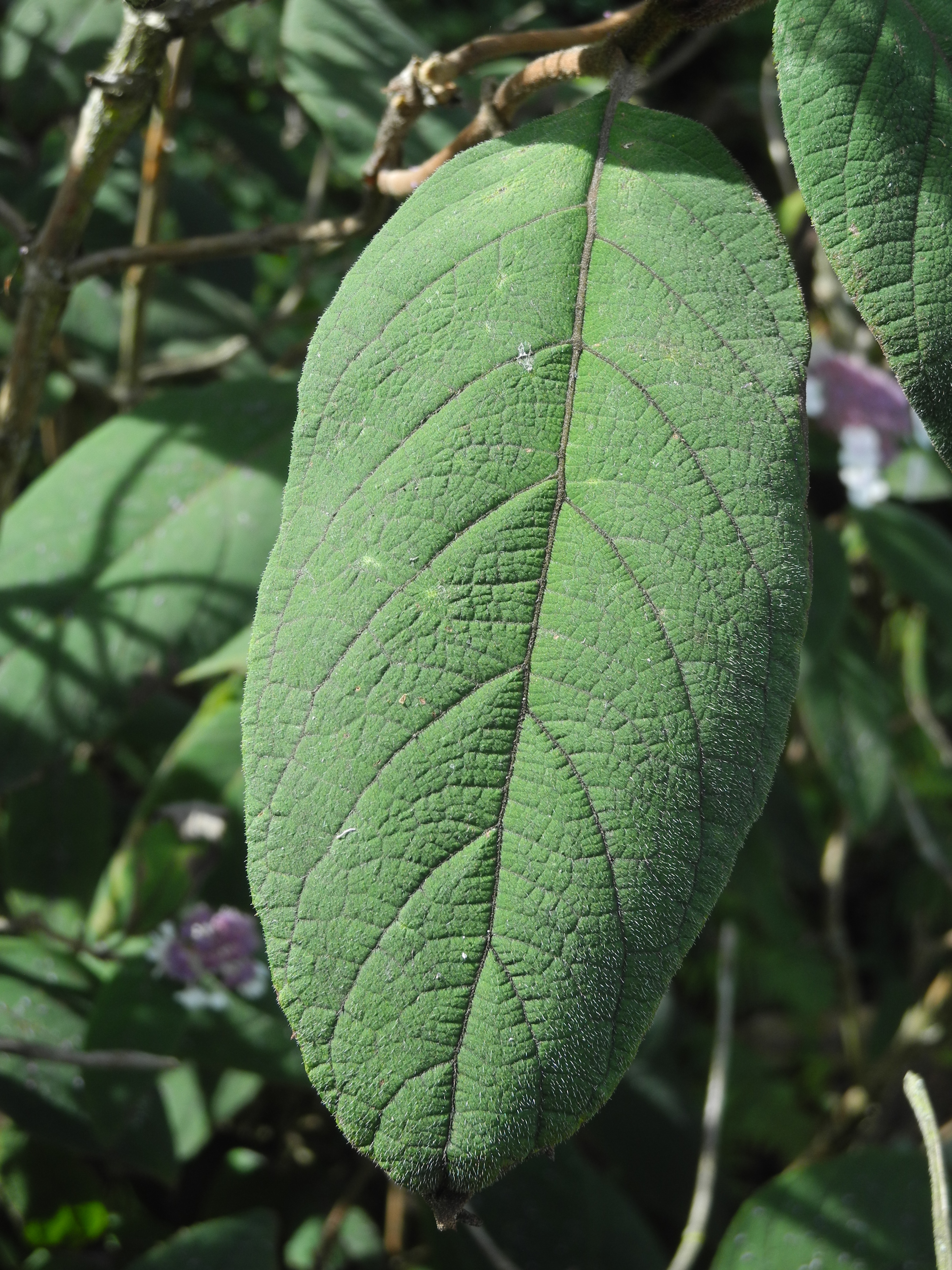
Detail of a leaf with purple venation and trichomes

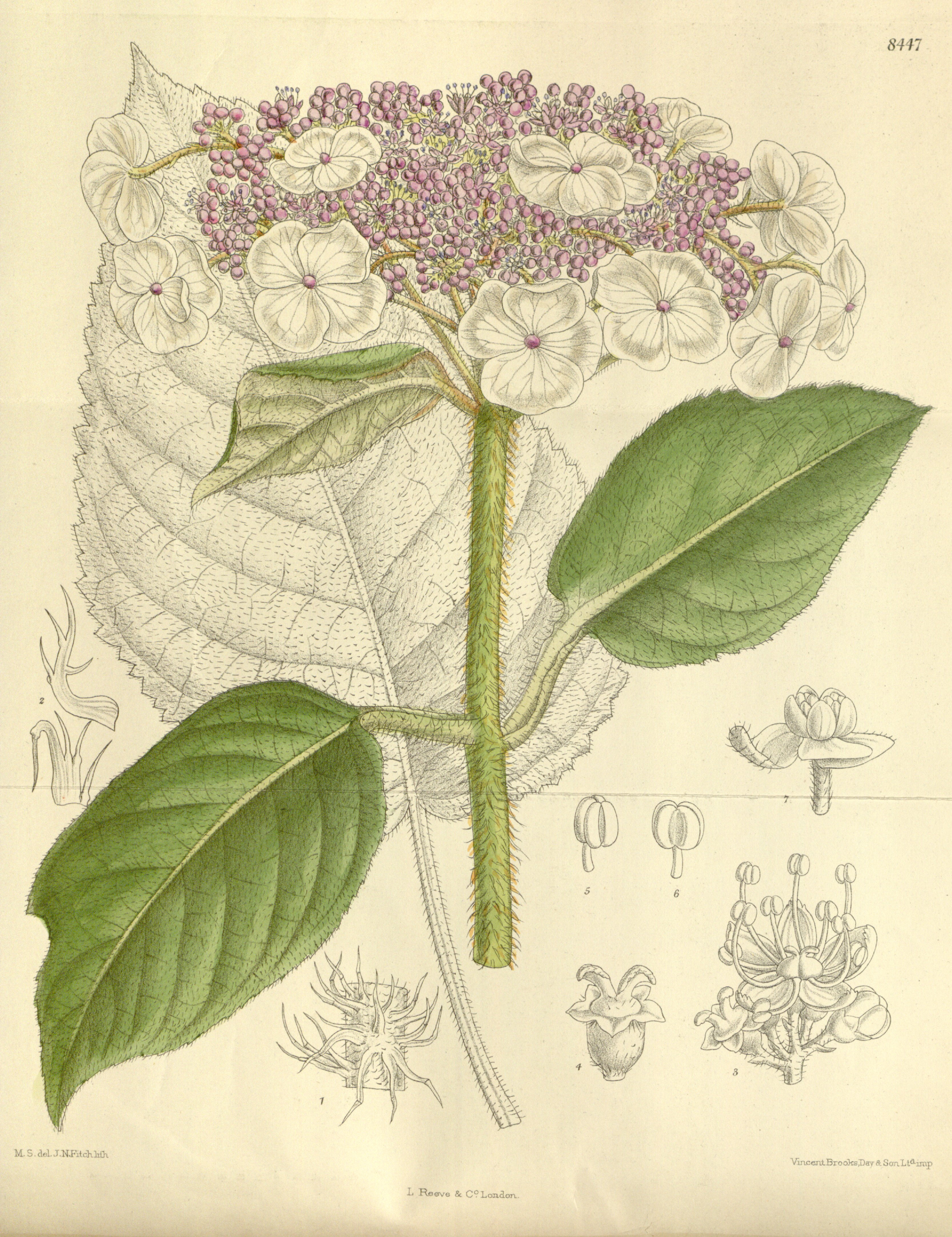
Botanical illustration of Hydrangea sargentiana
