= Kietlin =

Kietlin may refer to the following places in Poland:

- Kietlin, Lower Silesian Voivodeship (south-west Poland)
- Kietlin, Łódź Voivodeship (central Poland)
