= Ligota Mała =

Ligota Mała may refer to the following places in Poland:

- Ligota Mała, Dzierżoniów County in Lower Silesian Voivodeship (south-west Poland)
- Ligota Mała, Oleśnica County in Lower Silesian Voivodeship (south-west Poland)
- Ligota Mała, Opole Voivodeship (south-west Poland)
