= Wojsławice, Lower Silesian Voivodeship =

Wojsławice
- Village
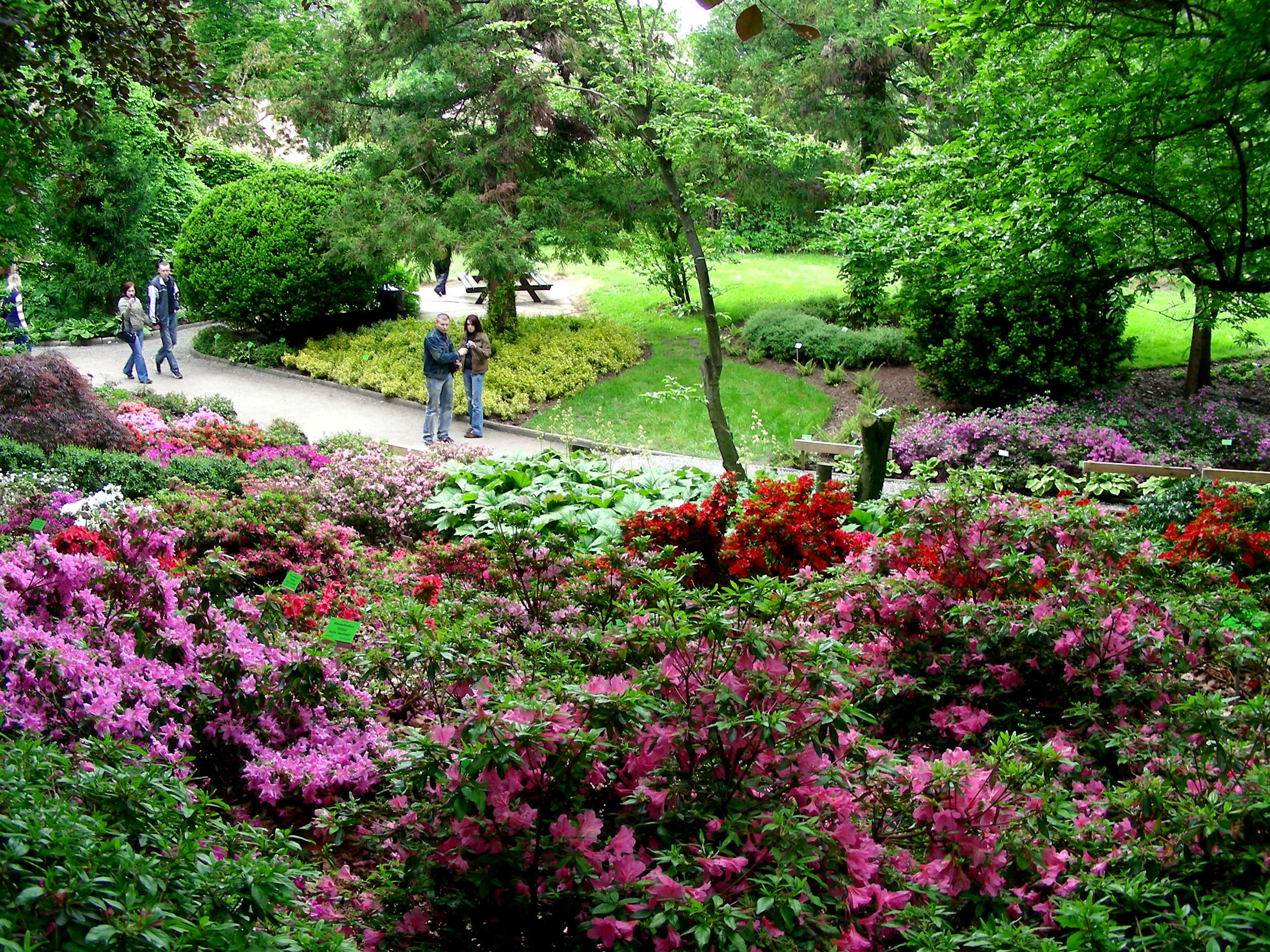
- Wojsławice Arboretum

- Location within Poland
- Coordinates: 50°43′00″N 16°51′12″E
- Country: Poland
- Voivodeship: Lower Silesian
- County: Dzierżoniów
- Gmina: Niemcza

Wojsławice [vɔi̯swaˈvit͡sɛ] is a village in the administrative district of Gmina Niemcza, within Dzierżoniów County, Lower Silesian Voivodeship, in south-western Poland. Wojsławice Arboretum is located here.
