= Przerzeczyn-Zdrój =

- Spa village
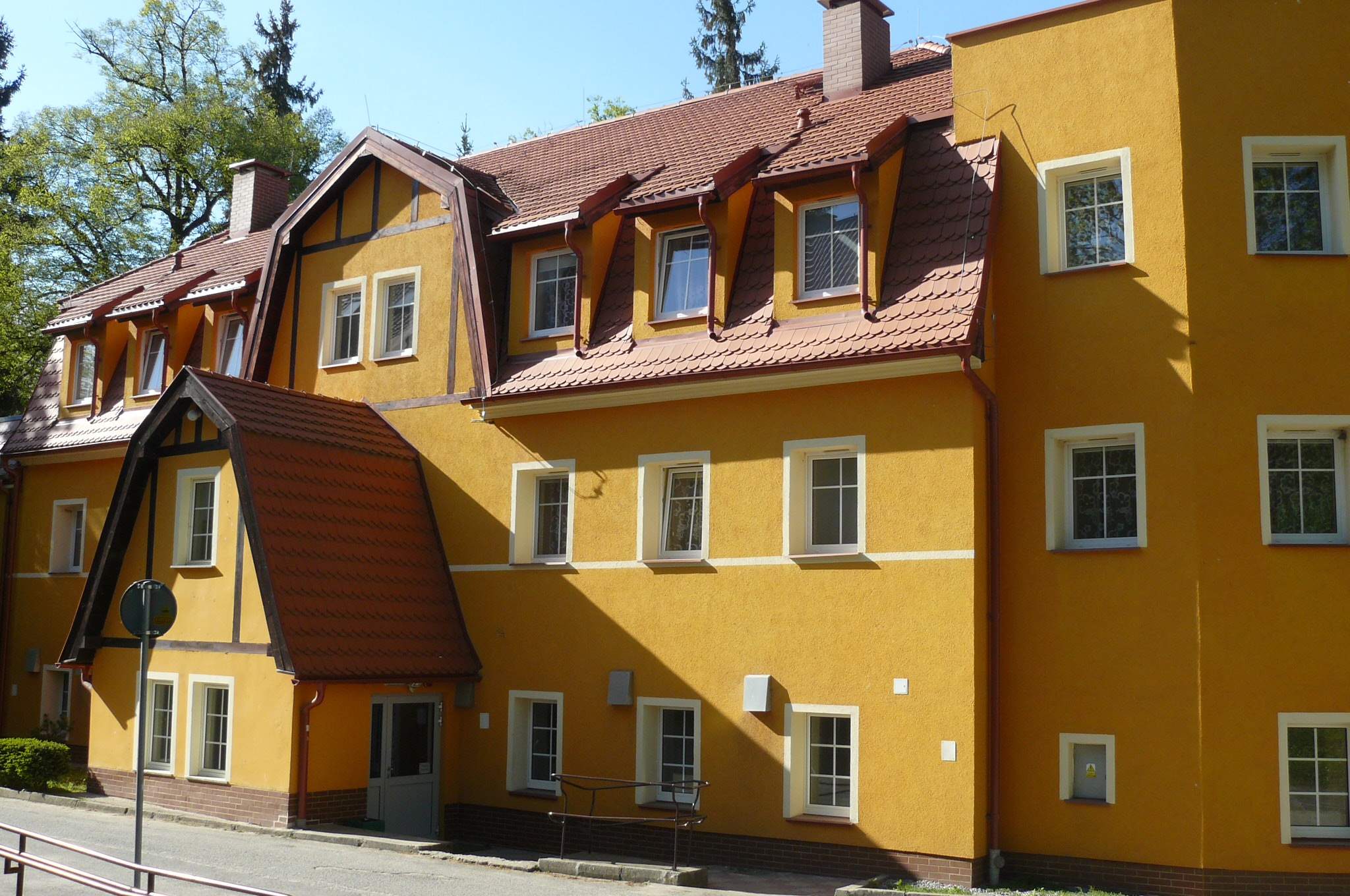

- Location within Poland
- Coordinates: 50°41′N 16°49′E
- Country: Poland
- Voivodeship: Lower Silesian
- County: Dzierżoniów
- Gmina: Niemcza

Population
  - Total: 700
- Time zone: UTC+1 (CET)
  - Summer (DST): UTC+2 (CEST)
- Vehicle registration: DDZ
- Website: http://www.przerzeczynzdroj.ta.pl/zdroj.htm

Przerzeczyn-Zdrój [pʂɛˈʐɛt͡ʂɨn ˈzdrui̯] is a spa village in the administrative district of Gmina Niemcza, within Dzierżoniów County, Lower Silesian Voivodeship, in south-western Poland.
