= Wojsławice Arboretum =

Arboretum in south-western Poland

Coordinates: 50°43′N 16°50′E

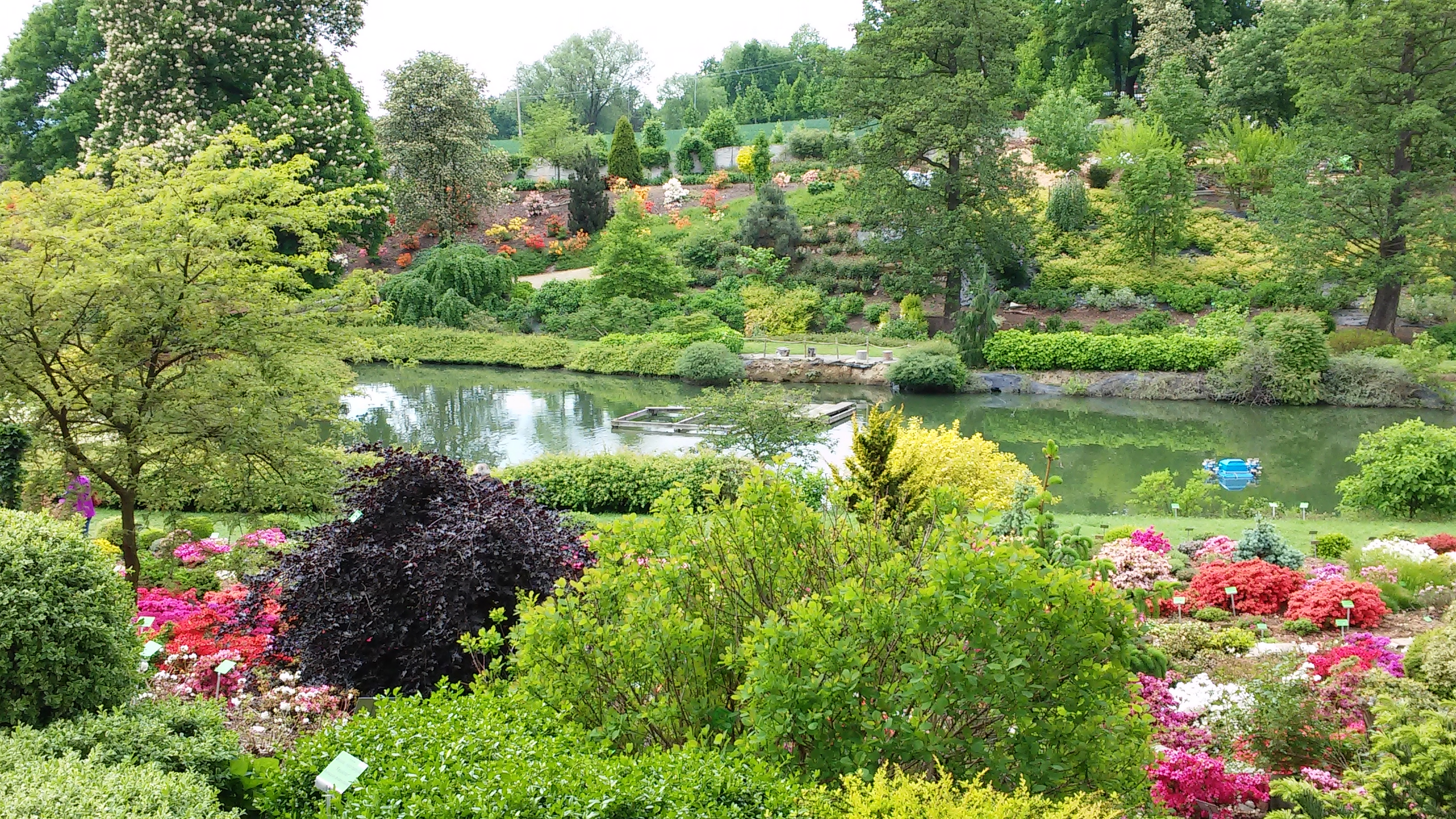
Plant collections

Wojsławice Arboretum is an arboretum, located in Wojsławice, Dzierżoniów County, Lower Silesian Voivodeship, in south-western Poland. It occupies an area of 62 ha.

Since 1988, Arboretum Wojsławice is a branch of the University of Wrocław Botanical Garden. The arboretum is renowned for a vast collections of Rhododendrons, Daylilies, Box and Peony plants as well as many other rare species and varieties of trees and shrubs. In year 2019 a Polish Millennial Garden has been opened. It presents a unique collection of polish-breed cultivars of ornamental plants as well as various Polish plant species that are threatened, endangered and protected.

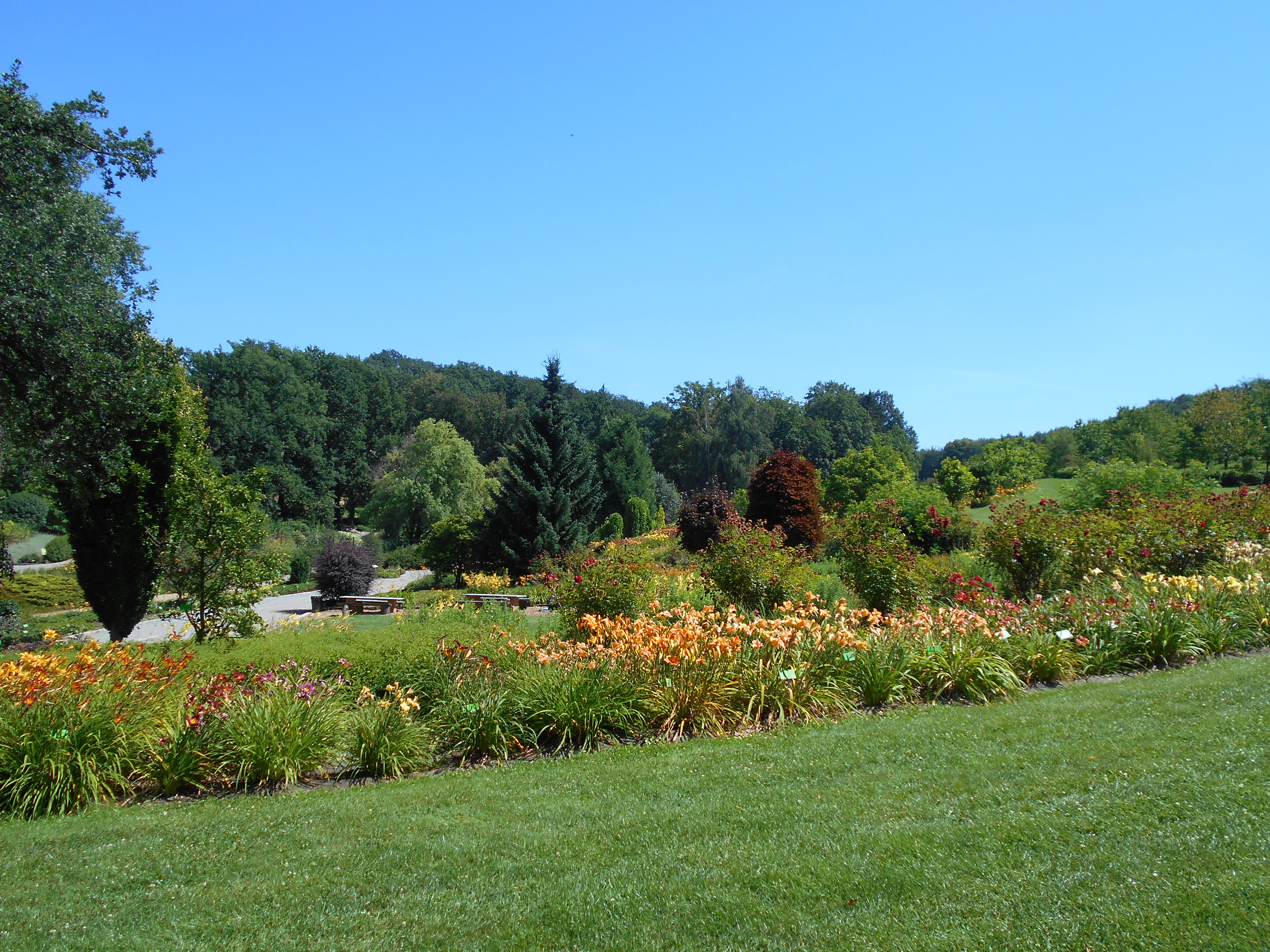
Part of Hemerocallis collection

It is located approximately 2 kilometres (1 mi) east of Niemcza, 14 kilometres (9 mi) east of Dzierżoniów and 50 kilometres (31 mi) south of Wrocław. It lies within the protected area of Niemcza-Strzelin Hills that administratively belongs to Niemcza commune in the Dzierżoniów district. The vicinity of Niemcza is formed by longitudinal ranges of the Gumińskie, Dębowe and Krzyżowe Hills with a varied geological structure cut by gentle ravines and gorges. At the bottom of the deepest gorge, at an altitude of 150–200 meters above sea level, flows the Ślęża River. Over one of its right-bank tributaries on the northern slopes of the Dębowe Wzgóża (Oak Hills) lies the Arboretum.

The total collection of the arboretum consists of 6532 woody plant species and 7445 perennial plants species. The large collections of rhododendrons (1350 taxa - including 124 taxa of historical Seidel-breed German hybrids), daylilies (3550 taxa) and buxus (144 taxa) have been registered as National Collections by the Polish Dendrological Society. In August 2021, four additional National Collections have been approved: Hydrangea (661 taxa), Hammamelidaceae family (162 taxa), Peony (537 taxa) and Periwinkle (ca. 50 taxa).

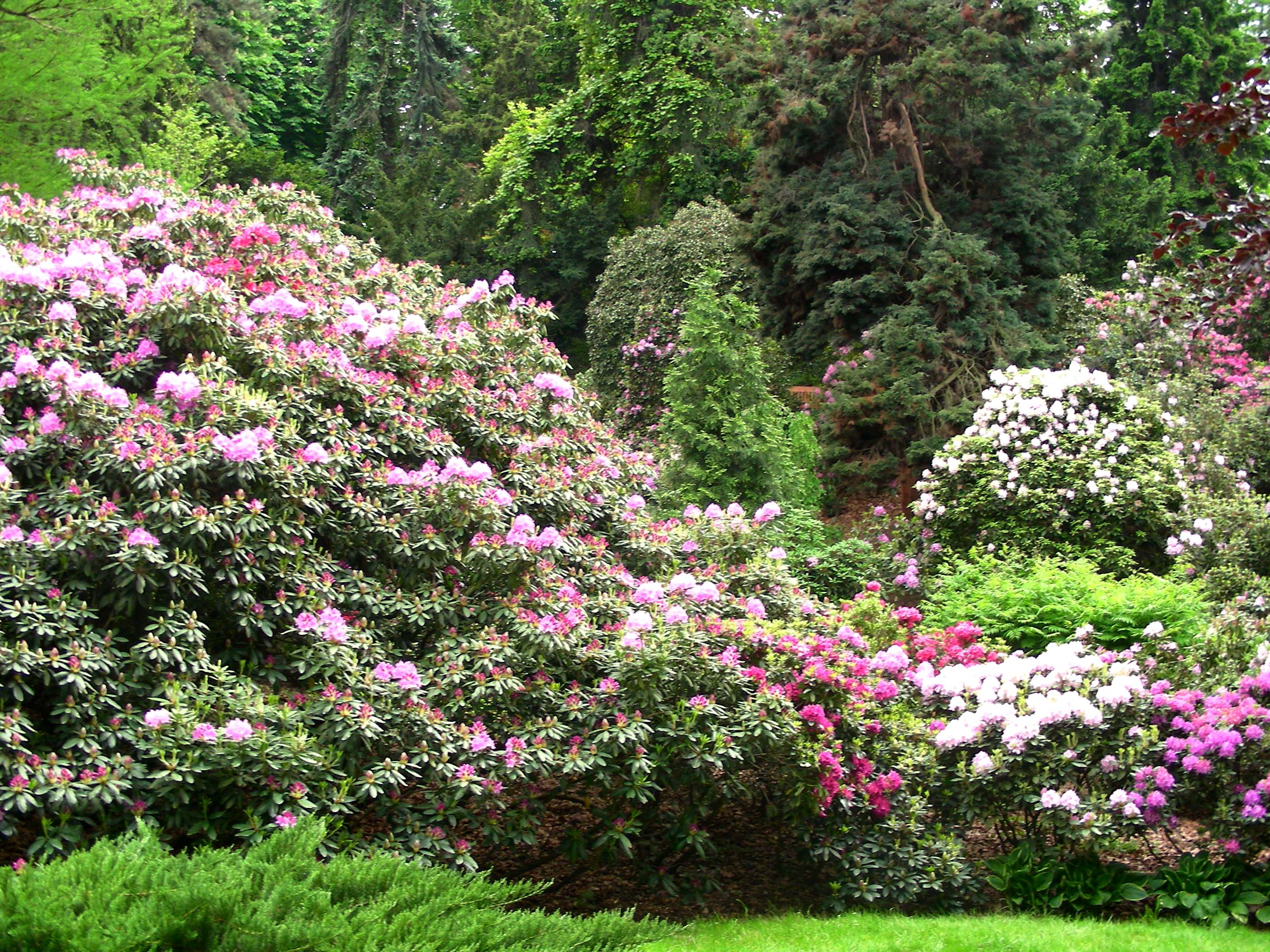
Part of Rododendron collection at the old Park

== History ==
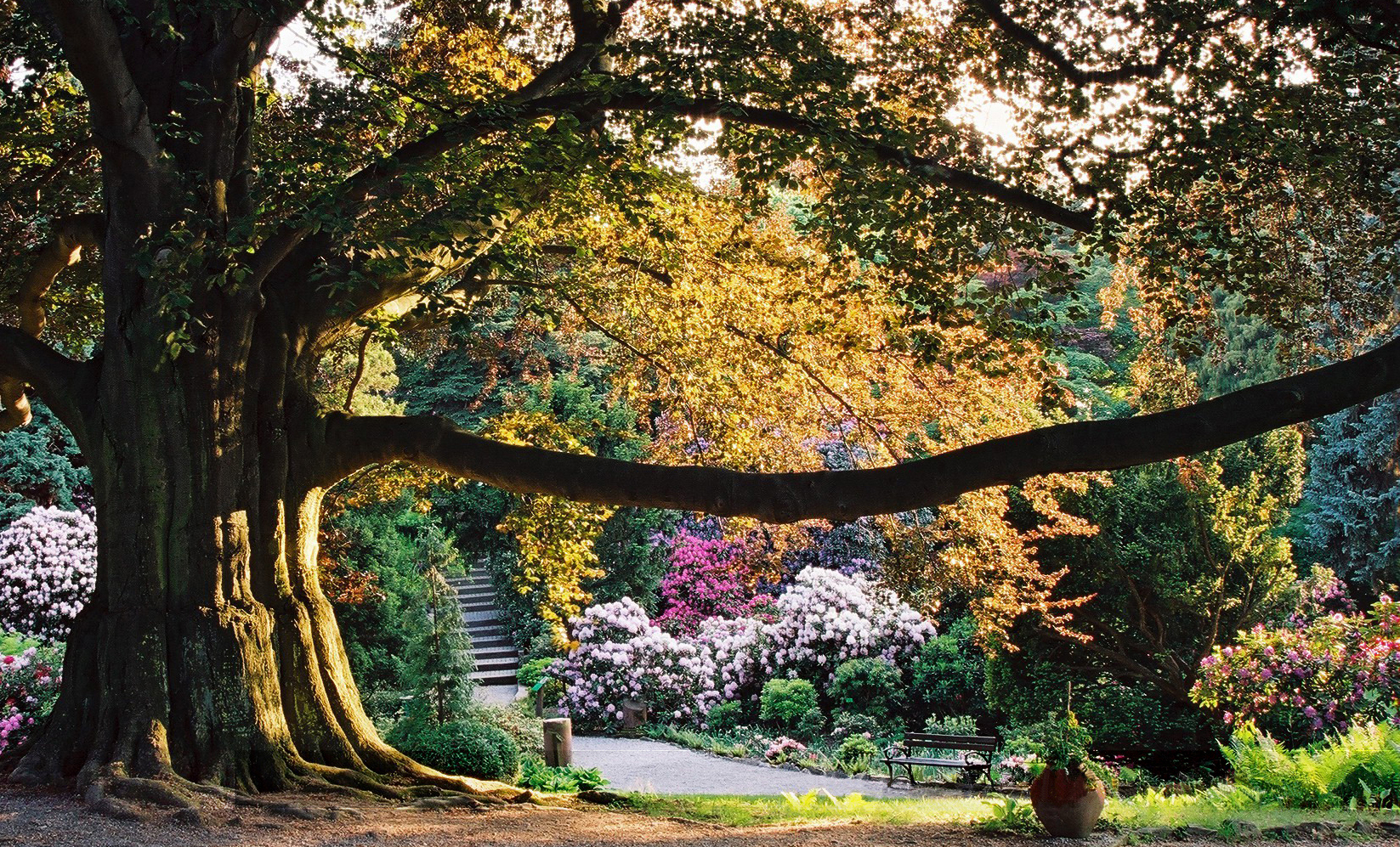
Fagus sylvatica f. purpurea - a heart of Arboretum

The arboretum was founded around 1811 when the owners of the Wojsławice village - von Prittwitz and von Aulock families started planting the first trees of non-European origin (mostly North American). The current design of the arboretum was created by Fritz von Oheimb in 1880 (commemorated by the Fritz Pond in the Arboretum), a Silesian landlord and a keen plant lover. He became an owner of 150 ha (370 acre) property in Wojsławice, with a romantic park created in 1821 by von Aulock family. Alongside his wife – Bertha von Oheimb - he began remodeling of the park, constantly acquiring new plant species. Since the beginning of twentieth century, rhododendron plants became his main specialization. In 1920, collection consisted of about 300 varieties. In 1890, Fritz donated them to the Botanical Garden in Wrocław. Fritz von Oheimb died on 11 October 1928, aged 78. He was buried within the grounds of the park. Until 1946, his passion was continued by his son – German geologist and botanist - Arno von Oheimb.

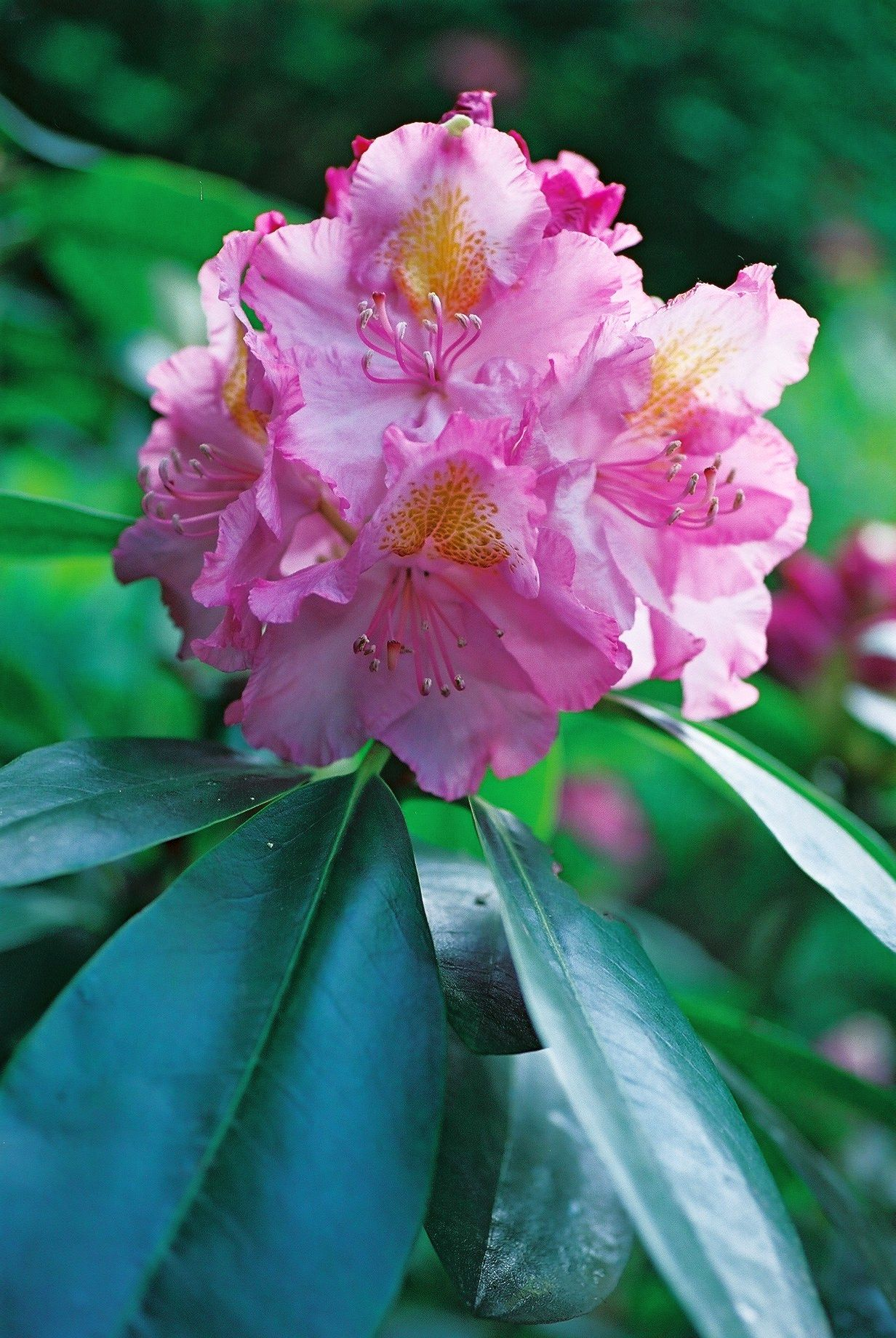
Rhododendron 'Von Oheimb Woislowitz' - T.J.R. Seidel (1906)

In 1906, as a recognition of Fritz's work, German rhododendron breeder Traugott Jacob Rudolf Seidel has named one of this late-blooming Rhododendron catawbiense hybrids ‘Von Oheimb Woislowitz’.

In 1983, the park became a historical site and since 1988 it is a branch of University of Wrocław.

In 2005, a new 54 ha (99 acre) grounds became attached as a new part of the park.

In 2011, collections of Rhododendron, Box and Hemerocallis were accredited by Polish Dendrological Society as a National Collections

Since 2013, Arboretum Wojsławice is accredited as a display garden of American Hemerocallis Society. Year later it became a European Station for Hemerocallis Evaluation

In 2017, the GEOretum has been opened. At the site of the local quarry a permanent exhibition of various Lower Silesian rocks is being presented

In 2020, the Polish Millennial Garden was officially opened for a public display.

In 2021, Polish Dendrological Society accepted 4 new National Collections – Hydrangea, Paeonia, Vinca and Hammamelidaceae.

== Plants Collection ==
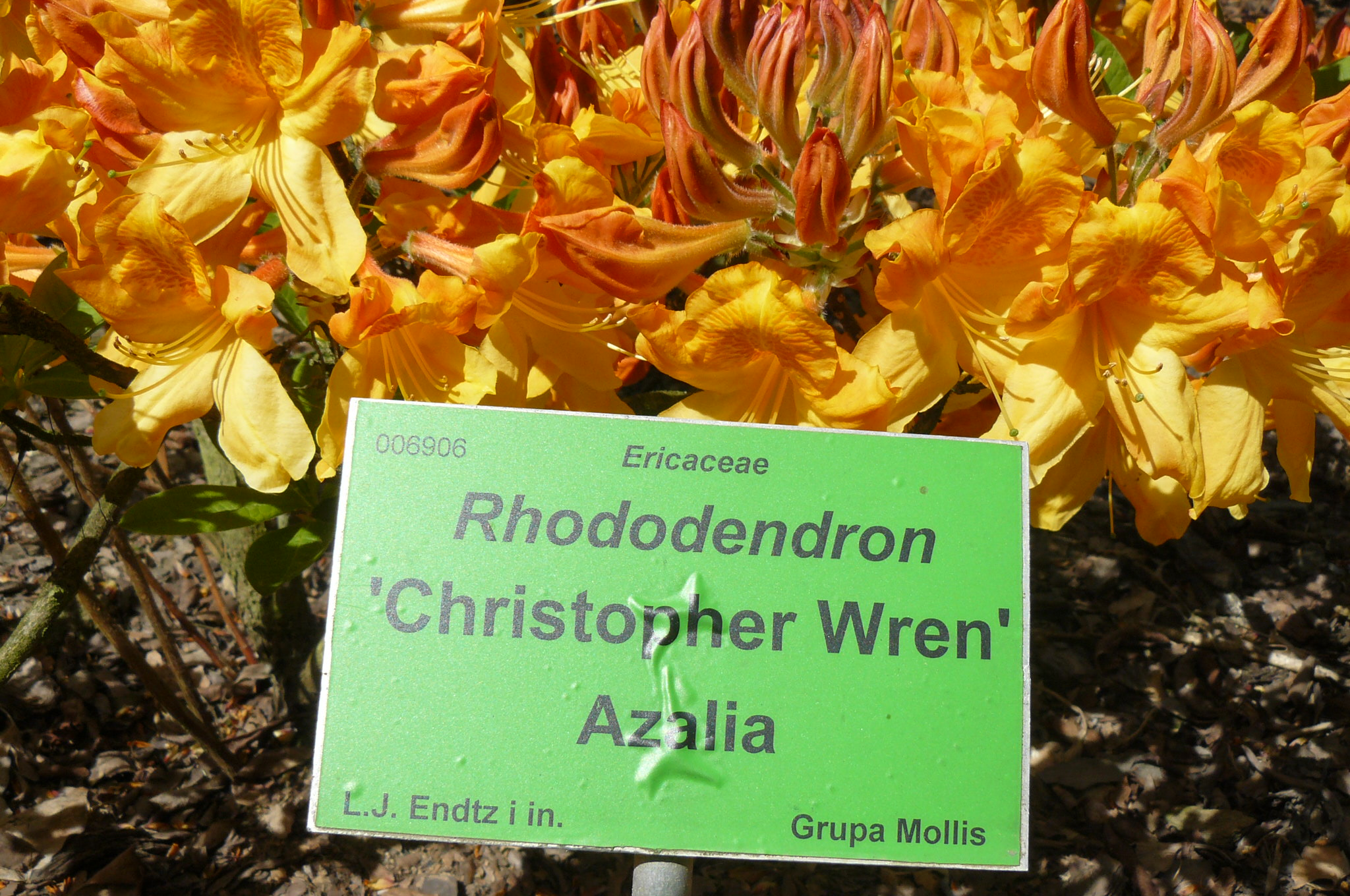
Plant labels in the Arboretum

Arboretum Wojsławice is a research, development and educational unit, therefore every plant is properly labeled.

=== Collection in numbers ===
In 2013, collection consisted of:

- 4650 species and varieties of Trees and Shrubs;
- 4885 species and varieties of perennial plants;

In 2020, collection consisted of:

- 886 taxa of coniferous trees and shrubs;
- 5646 taxa of deciduous trees and shrubs;
- 7273 species and varieties of perennials;
- 172 taxa of ferns;

=== Main collections ===
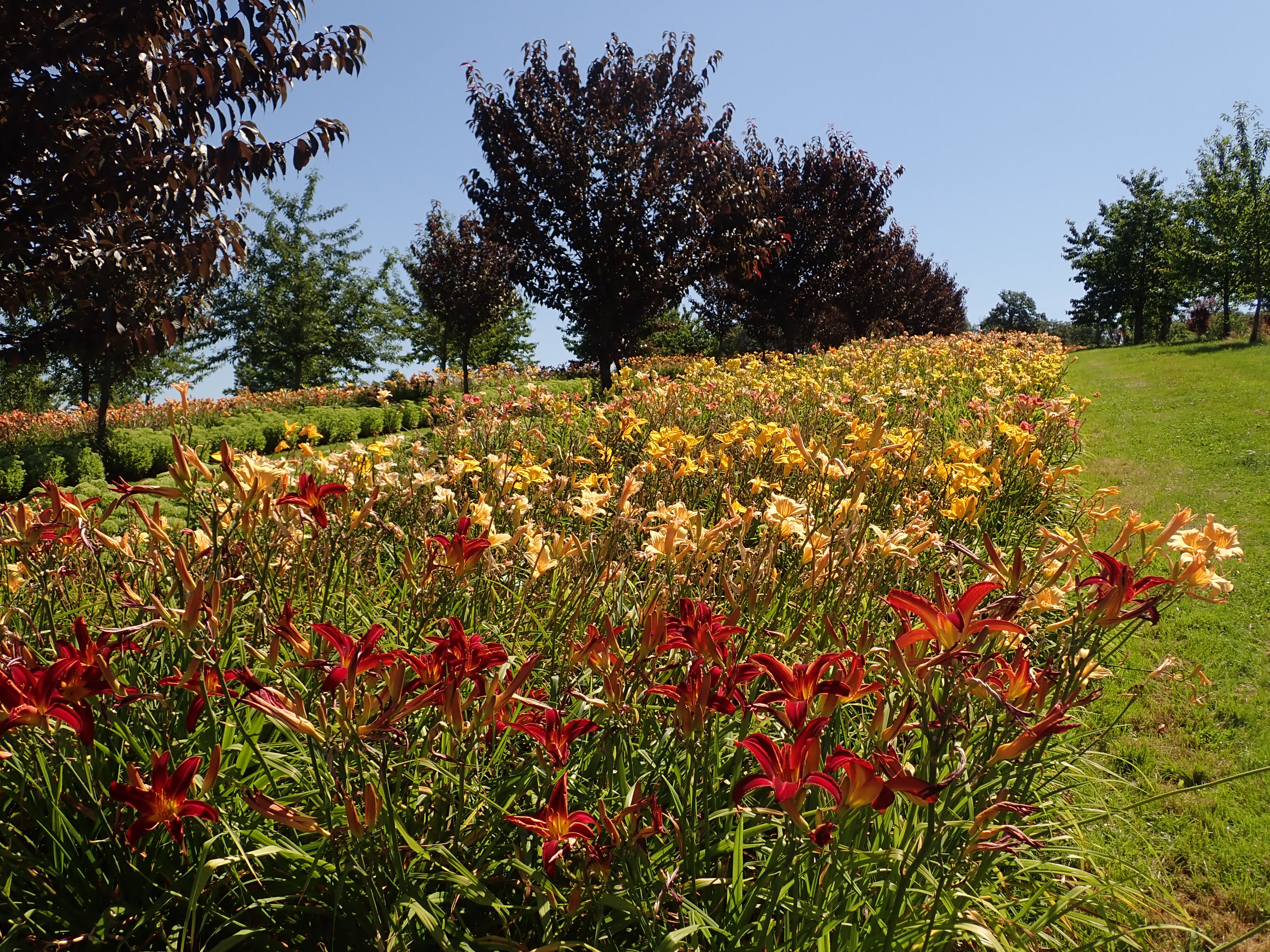
Daylilies collection

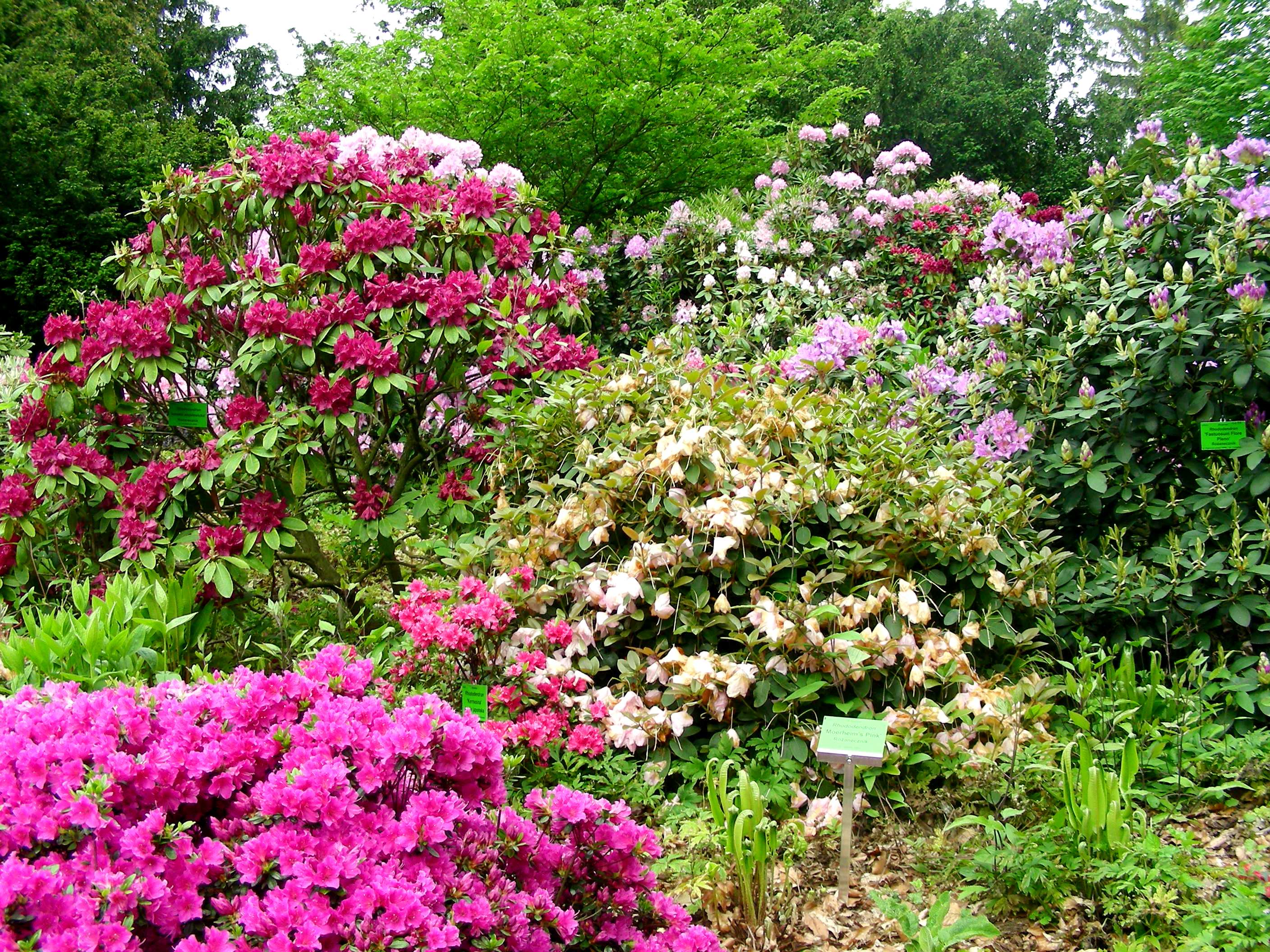
Rhododendrons in Wojsławice

- Rododendron (Rhododendron) - 1350 species and varieties – including 124 historic Seidel hybrids;
- Daylily (Hemerocallis) - 3550 taxa;
- Box (Buxus) - 144 taxa;
- Hydrangea (Hydrangea) - over 650 taxa;
- Magnolia (Magnolia) – over 100 taxa;
- Maidenhair Tree (Ginkgo) – over 120 taxa;
- Lilac (Syringa) – over 160 taxa;
- False Spiraea (Astilbe) – ca. 90 taxa;
- Ornamental grasses – over 650 taxa;
- Purple Coneflower (Echinacea) – over 100 taxa;
- Funkias (Hosta) – over 260 taxa;
- Pear tree (Pyrus) – over 200 taxa;
- Sweetcherry (Prunus) – a historical genbank of Lower Silesian varieties with ca. 200 taxa;
- Doggwood (Cornus) – over 140 taxa;

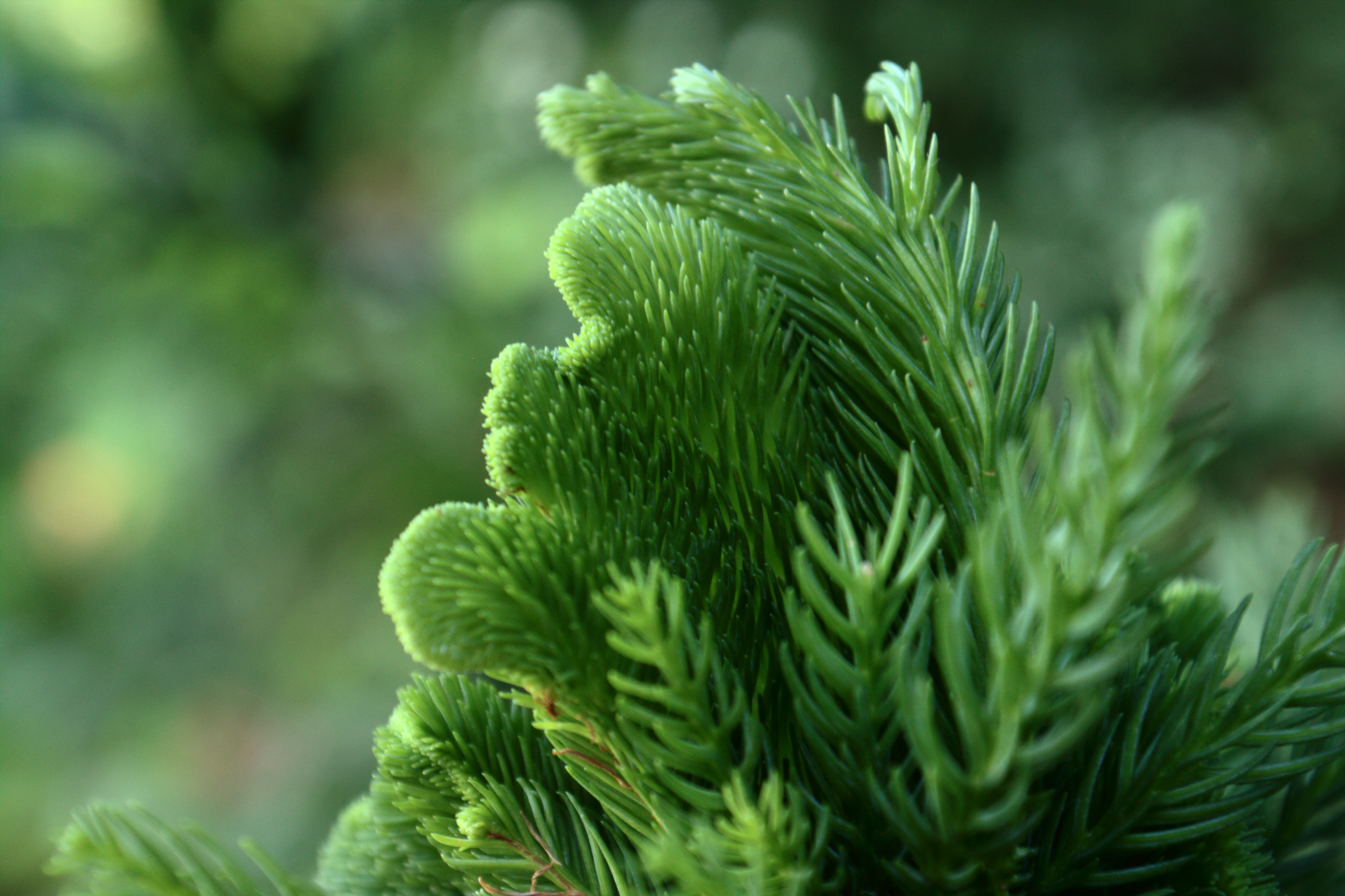
Cryptomeria japonica 'Cristata'

=== Most interesting specimens ===
- Common red leafed beech (Fagus sylvatica f. purpurea) – height 24 meters, girth 4 meters;
- Common red leafed fountain beech (Fagus sylvatica ‘Purpurea Pendula’) – planted by Fritz von Oheimb, one of the oldest of its kind in Poland;
- Cedar of Lebanon (Cedrus libani) – the biggest and the oldest specimen in Poland (planted in 1965). Height 21 m, trunk diameter 0,6 m
- Incense cedar (Calocedrus decurrens);
- Canadian hemlock (Tsuga canadensis);
- Sawara cypress (Chamaecyparis pisifera ‘Squarrosa’);
- Bald cypress (Taxodium distichum);
- Maidenhair tree (Ginkgo biloba);
- Plum yew (Cephalotaxus harringtonia);
- Common columnar hornbeam (Carpinus betulus ‘Columnaris’);
- Large-flowered panicle hydrangea (Hydrangea paniculata ‘Grandiflora’);
- Rough-leaved Sargentii hydrangea (Hydrangea aspera subsp. sargentiana) – big specimen planted about year 1900;
- Common ash (Fraxinus excelsior ‘Heterophylla Pendula’) – a big rarity in Poland;
- Nikko fir (Abies homolepis);
- Spanish chestnut (Castanea sativa);
- Bottlebrush buckeye (Aesculus parviflora) – one big clump planted by Oheimb;
- Japanese maple (Acer palmatum);
- Hedge maple (Acer campestre ‘Postelense’);
- Northern Japanese magnolia (Magnolia kobus);
- Giant sequoia (Sequoiadendron giganteum) – one of three old specimens in Polish climate. Grown from seed in 1962. In 2018 it had 30 meters in height and 442 cm in girth;
- Dawn redwood (Metasequoia glyptostroboides);
- Blue sausage fruit (Decaisnea fargesii);
- Smoketree (Cotinus coggygria);
- Balkan pine (Pinus peuce);
- Japanese umbrella tree (Sciadopitys verticillata) – the biggest and the oldest specimen in Poland (height 15 meters, grith of 1,18 meters);
- Japanese cedar (Cryptomeria japonica);
- Oriental spruce (Picea orientalis);
- Colorado blue spruce (Picea pungens ‘Glauca’);
- Tulip tree (Liriodendron tulipifera);
- Crimson glory vine (Vitis coignetiae) – over 100 years old specimen, 25 meters high, the oldest in Poland;

== Historical Monuments ==
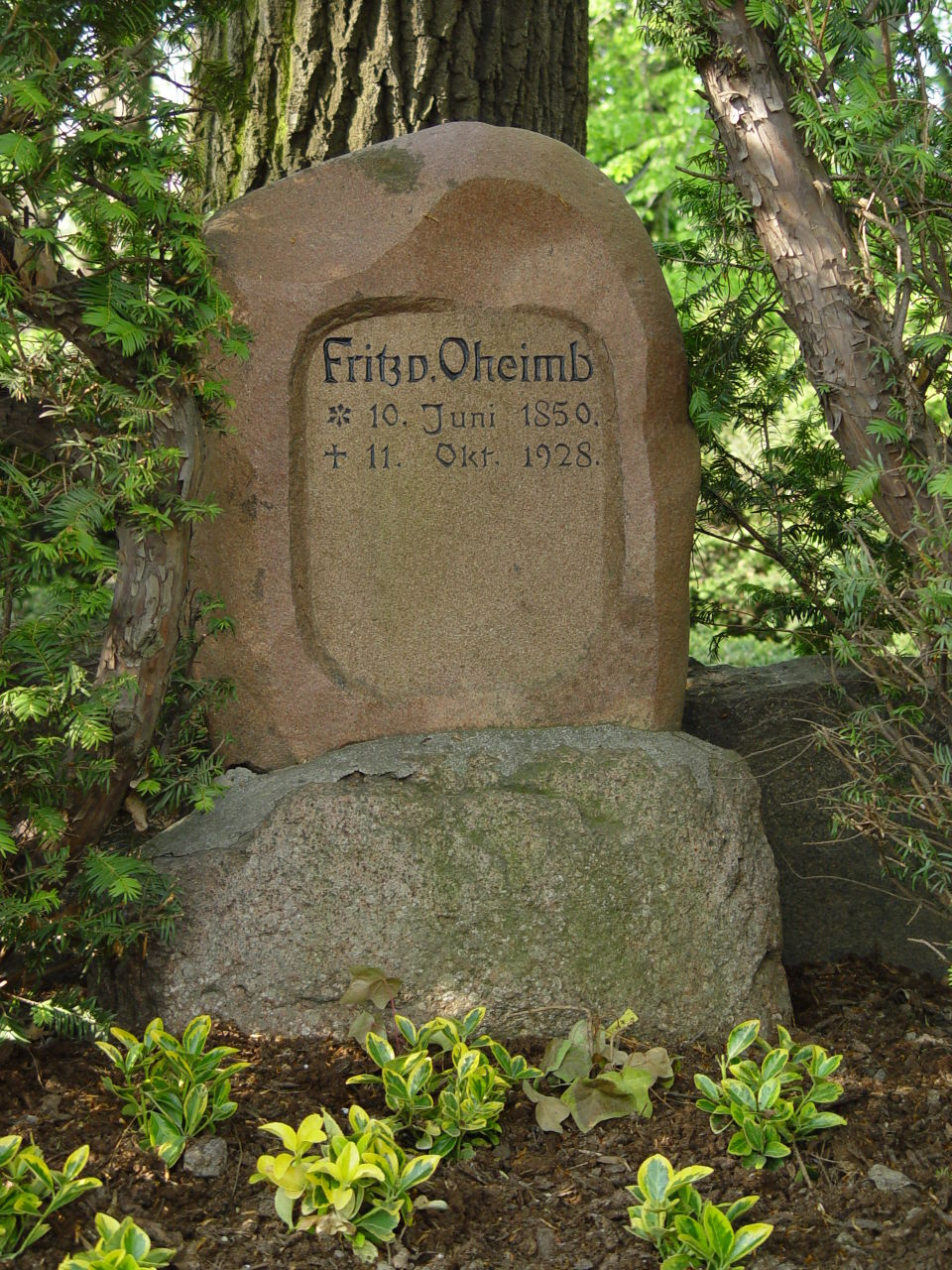
Oheimb's grave in the Park

Within the grounds of the Arboretum can be found:

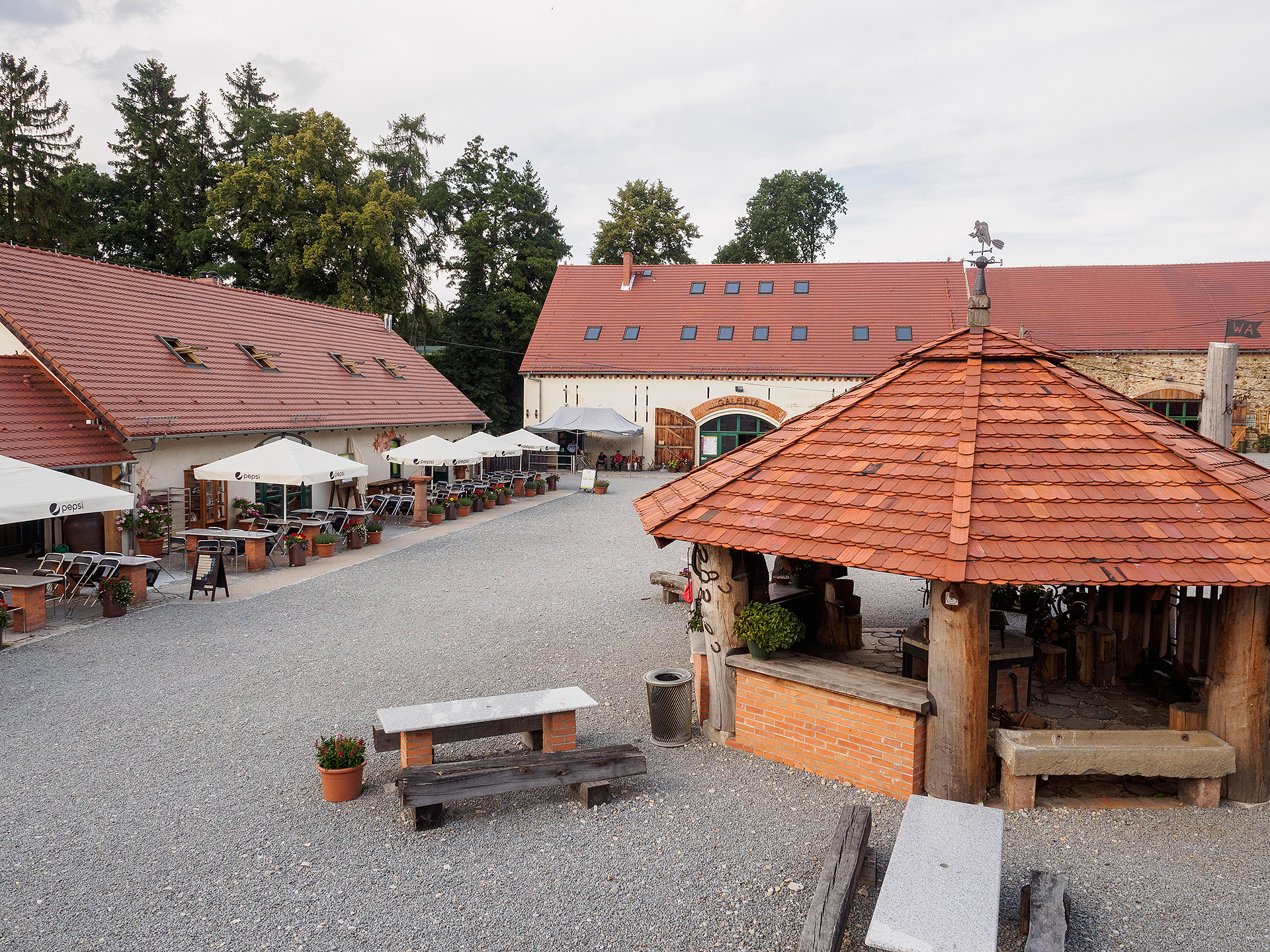
Historic farm with forge

- A historic farm (1844) with a restored wheel forge (2005)
- Greenhouse dating back to 1880 build of local mica state with preserved drainage from XIX century. Renovated in 1999.
- Two-story gardener's house (ca. 1900)
- Grave of Arboretum Founder – Fritz von Oheimb – made of red granite (1928)
- Numerous columns made of red Permian sandstone (XIX century) form farm buildings in the nearby villages
- Historic sandstone mill wheel

== Tourism ==
Arboretum is open for visitors from May to September.

In May, Rhododendrons and Azaleas are in bloom, accompanied by numerous species of Pieris, Enkianthus, Leucothoe, Kalmia and Calluna.

June the season of Roses. Hostas presents their decorative foliage. At the slope of Ostra Góra, Sweetcherries of Lower Silesian Historical Sweetcherries varieties Gene Bank starts to ripen.

In July, daylilies bloom. Lacy leafes of ferns present their full glory and fluffy iinflorescences of fake spiraea are in full bloom. Sweet mock-oranges intoxicate with intense scent.

August bursts with numerous cultivars of hydrangea; phloxes and geraniums are in full bloom. Lavender and butterfly bushes attract swarms of butterflies and insects; large flowered-clematis and shrub hibiscus add color to a spectacle of midsummer

In autumn, perennial borders are dominated by multi-colored grasses, stonecrops, tickseeds, windflowers and purple coneflowers. Fruits of exotic species of trees and shrubs colorize.

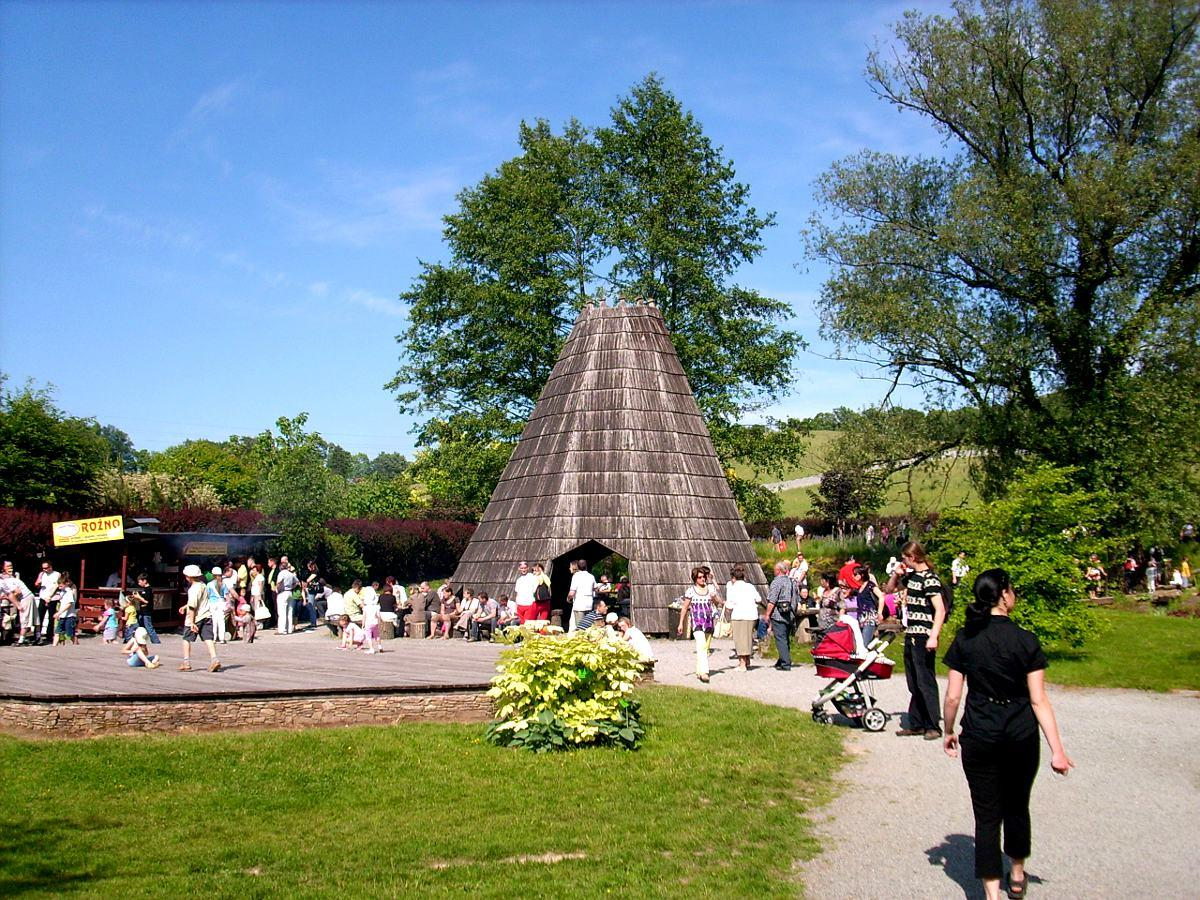
Barbecue and resting area with playground in the back

=== Available for Guests ===
- Charge-free parking and restrooms
- Wheelchair
- A place to change small children
- Paramedic's helps at weekends and special events
- Wireless internet
- Tables with electric sockets
- Picnic and barbecue area for rent
- Child's playground
- Resting places for lying on your own blanket
- Two eateries – on the grange and in the garden
- Themed weekends
- Plant sales point

== Polish Millennial Garden ==
In spring 2020, 5-hectare Polish Millennial Garden created since 2017, was incorporated into the garden grounds. It is a presentation of Polish bredders’ achievements in creation of new plant varieties. Collection consists both of modern and forgotten pre-war cultivars. Didactic boards describing the history of Polish breeding are exposed in five resting sheds. Additionally, Millennial Garden is a place of ex-situ conservation of endangered, threatened and protected plant species. Established conservation sites include species such as: Rosa gallica, Linum austracum, Allium ursinum, Dictamnus albus, Gladiolus palustris.

Initially, the collection consisted of a thousand plant varieties to commemorate the 1000th anniversary of the Siege of Niemcza (1017)

Currently collection lists 1987 plant varieties (as of September 1, 2021).

The most numerous collections are:

- 1078 varieties of daylilies (Hemerocallis)
- 201 varieties of flags (Iris)
- 77 varieties of Clematis (Clematis)
- 50 varieties of Rhododendron (Rhododendron)
- 48 varieties of Spruce (Picea)
- 35 varieties of barberry (Berberis)
- 35 varieties of miscanthus (Miscanthus)
- 28 varieties of ornamental and utility apples (Malus)

== Surroundings ==
Less than 20 km

- Gola Dzierżoniowska Castle
- Lake of Sieniawka - Beach, swimming, beach volley
- Medieval town of Niemcza
- Horseriding at Bielawa
- Aquapark Aquarius of Bielawa
- Cistercian monastery at Henryków

== Bibliography ==
- Hanna Grzeszczak-Nowak, Tomasz Nowak: Przewodnik po Arboretum w Wojsławicach. Wyd. I. Wrocław: A.U.T. Interior, 2003. ISBN 978-8391781869 (in Polish);
- Official website www.arboretumwojslawice.pl, (in Polish);
- Tomasz Nowak, Hanna Grzeszczak-Nowak, Katalog 1000 Polskich Odmian Roślin, Wyd. I, Warszawa -Wrocław, Colonel Kraków, 2019, ISBN 978-8393833849 (in Polish);
- Hanna Grzeszczak-Nowak: Arboretum Wojslawice - Rewaloryzacja oraz stare i nowe kolekcje roślin, Arboretum Bolestraszyce 1995 (3): 23–24;
- Muszer Jolanta: Georetum in the Arboretum in Wojsławice - stop 5, XXIV Konferencja Naukowa Sekcji Paleontologicznej PTG, Wrocław, Długopole Górne, 11–14.09.2019. ISBN 978-8394230487;
- Robert Tarka, Krzysztof Moskwa: Tourism Development opportunities in River Valleys of the Niemcza-Strzelin Hills, Walory przyrodnicze Wzgórz Niemczańsko-Strzelińskich (13): 113–126;
