= Nowa Wieś Niemczańska =

- Village
- Location within Poland
- Coordinates: 50°41′36″N 16°49′04″E
- Country: Poland
- Voivodeship: Lower Silesian
- County: Dzierżoniów
- Gmina: Niemcza
- Population: 450

Nowa Wieś Niemczańska [ˈnɔva ˈvjɛɕ ɲɛmˈt͡ʂaɲska] is a village in the administrative district of Gmina Niemcza, within Dzierżoniów County, Lower Silesian Voivodeship, in south-western Poland.
