= Wilków Wielki =

- Village
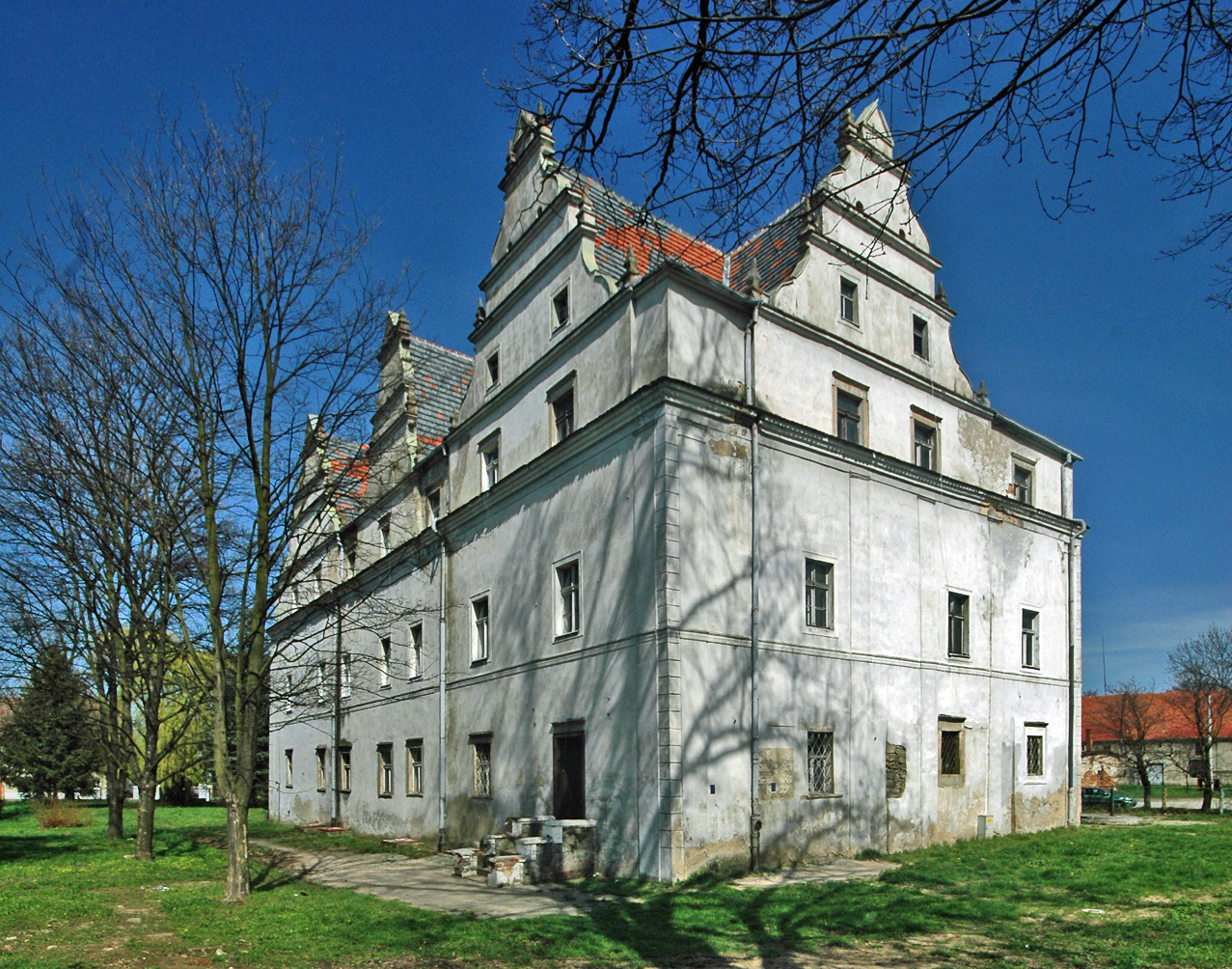
- Manor in Wilków Wielki

- Location within Poland
- Coordinates: 50°45′N 16°51′E
- Country: Poland
- Voivodeship: Lower Silesian
- County: Dzierżoniów
- Gmina: Niemcza

Population
  - Total: 500

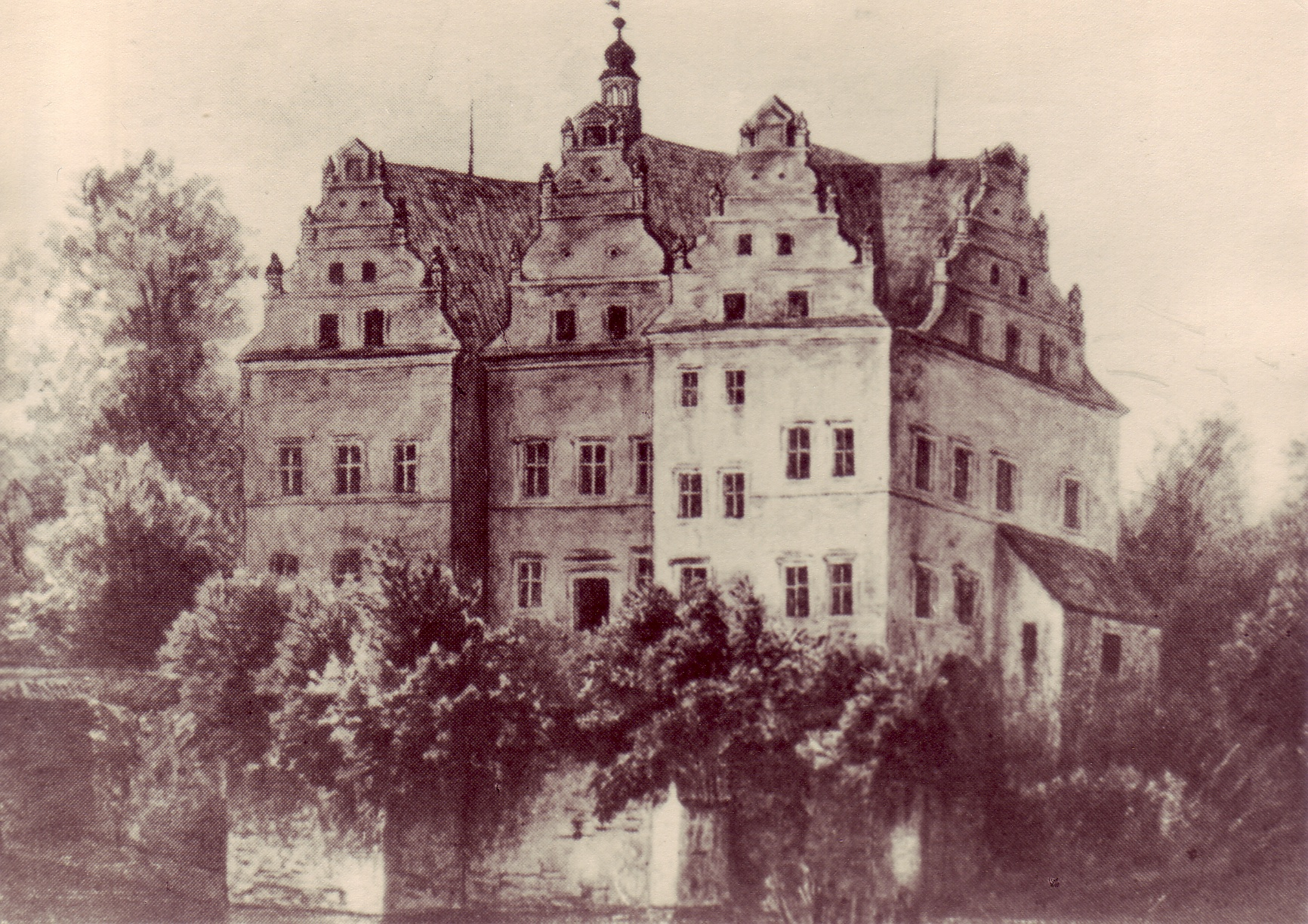
1700-1800 Castle Groß Wilkau

Wilków Wielki (Polish pronunciation: [ˈvilkuv ˈvjɛlkʲi]) is a village in the administrative district of Gmina Niemcza, within Dzierżoniów County, Lower Silesian Voivodeship, in south-western Poland.
