= Gmina Niemcza =

Gmina Niemcza Niemcza Commune
- Gmina
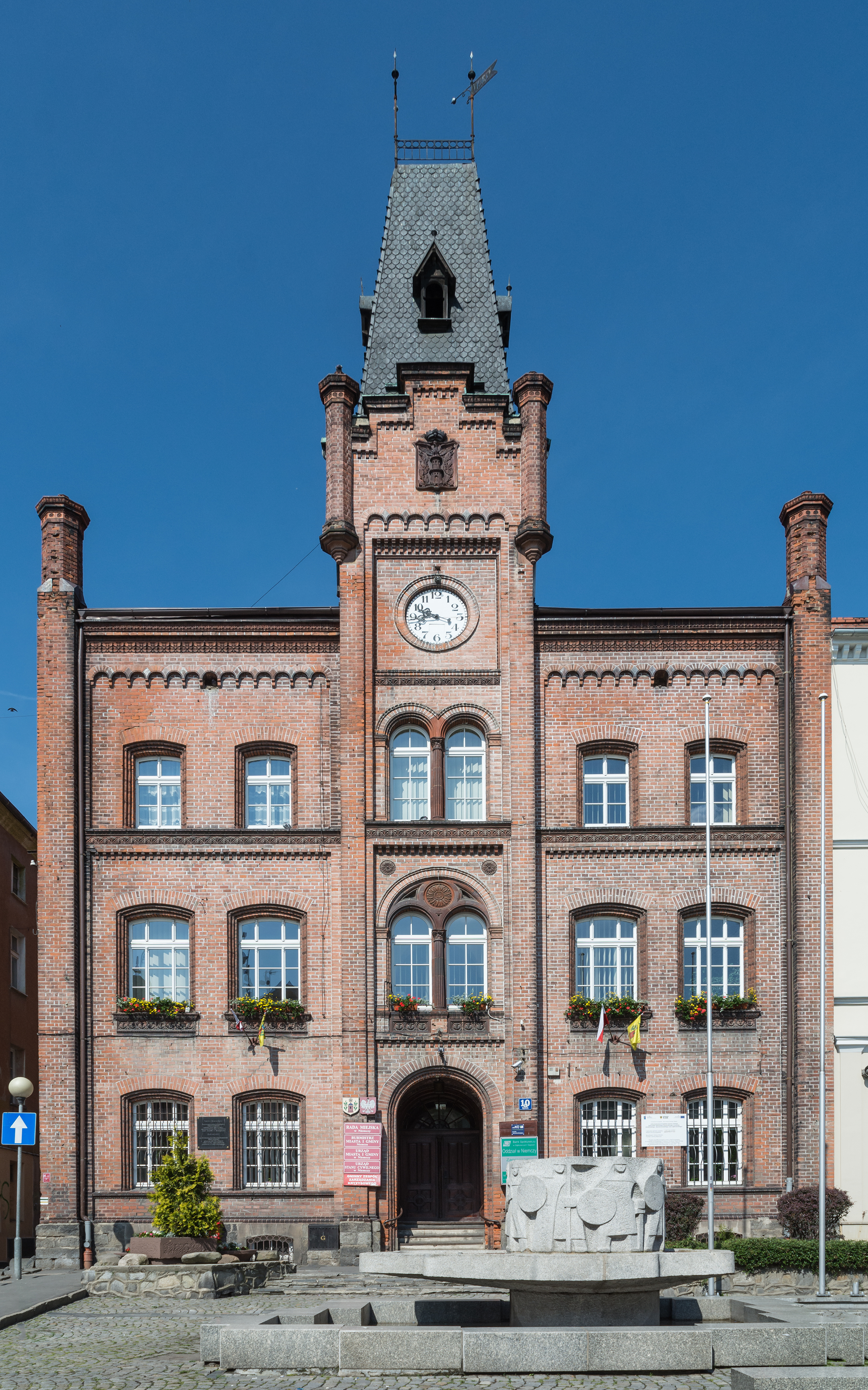
- Town Hall in Niemcza, seat of the gmina office

- Flag Coat of arms
- Interactive map of Gmina Niemcza
- Coordinates (Niemcza): 50°43′N 16°50′E
- Country: Poland
- Voivodeship: Lower Silesian
- County: Dzierżoniów
- Seat: Niemcza

Area
  - Total: 72.07 km^{2} (27.83 sq mi)

Population (2019-06-30)
  - Total: 5,473
  - Density: 75.94/km^{2} (196.7/sq mi)
- Time zone: UTC+1 (CET)
  - Summer (DST): UTC+2 (CEST)
- Vehicle registration: DDZ
- Website: https://www.um.niemcza.pl/

Gmina Niemcza is an urban-rural gmina (administrative district) in Dzierżoniów County, Lower Silesian Voivodeship, in south-western Poland. Its seat is the town of Niemcza, which lies approximately 20 kilometres (12 mi) east of Dzierżoniów and 48 km (30 mi) south of the regional capital Wrocław.

The gmina covers an area of 72.07 square kilometres (27.83 sq mi), and as of 2019 its total population is 5,473.

== Neighbouring gminas ==
Gmina Niemcza is bordered by the town of Piława Górna and the gminas of Ciepłowody, Dzierżoniów, Kondratowice, Łagiewniki and Ząbkowice Śląskie.

== Villages ==
Apart from the town of Niemcza, the gmina contains the villages of Chwalęcin, Gilów, Gola Dzierżoniowska, Kietlin, Ligota Mała, Nowa Wieś Niemczańska, Podlesie, Przerzeczyn-Zdrój, Ruszkowice, Wilków Wielki and Wojsławice.

== Twin towns – sister cities ==
Gmina Niemcza is twinned with:

- Gladenbach, Germany
- Letohrad, Czech Republic
- Monteux, France
