= Podlesie, Dzierżoniów County =

Podlesie
- Village
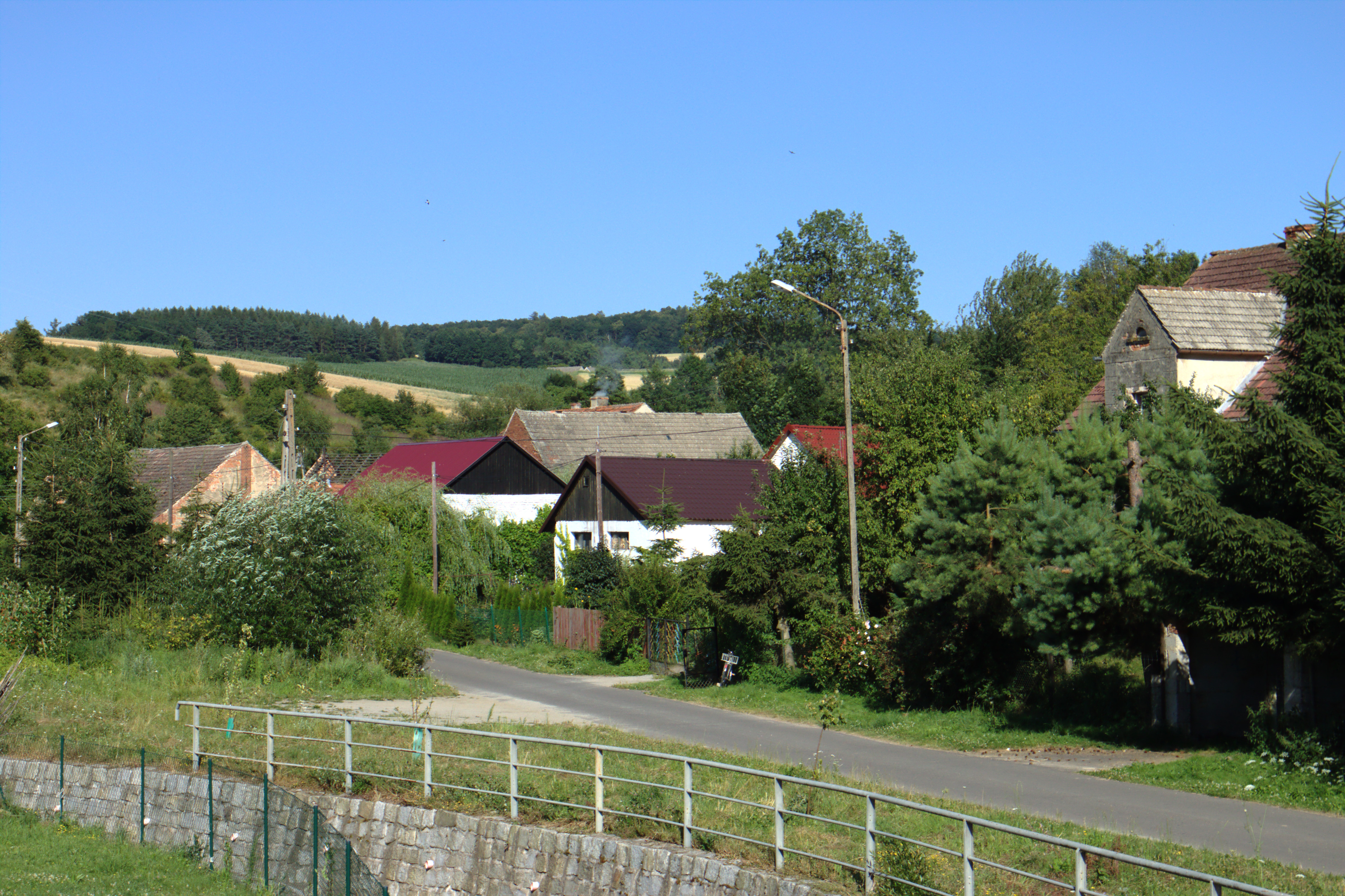

- Location within Poland
- Coordinates: 50°41′N 16°52′E
- Country: Poland
- Voivodeship: Lower Silesian
- County: Dzierżoniów
- Gmina: Niemcza
- Population: 200

Podlesie [pɔdˈlɛɕɛ] is a village in the administrative district of Gmina Niemcza, within Dzierżoniów County, Lower Silesian Voivodeship, in south-western Poland.
