= Chwalęcin, Lower Silesian Voivodeship =

Chwalęcin
- Village
- Location within Poland
- Coordinates: 50°45′16″N 16°52′28″E
- Country: Poland
- Voivodeship: Lower Silesian
- County: Dzierżoniów
- Gmina: Niemcza
- Population: 70

Chwalęcin [xfaˈlɛnt͡ɕin] is a village in the administrative district of Gmina Niemcza, within Dzierżoniów County, Lower Silesian Voivodeship, in south-western Poland.
