= Gilów, Lower Silesian Voivodeship =

Gilów
- Village
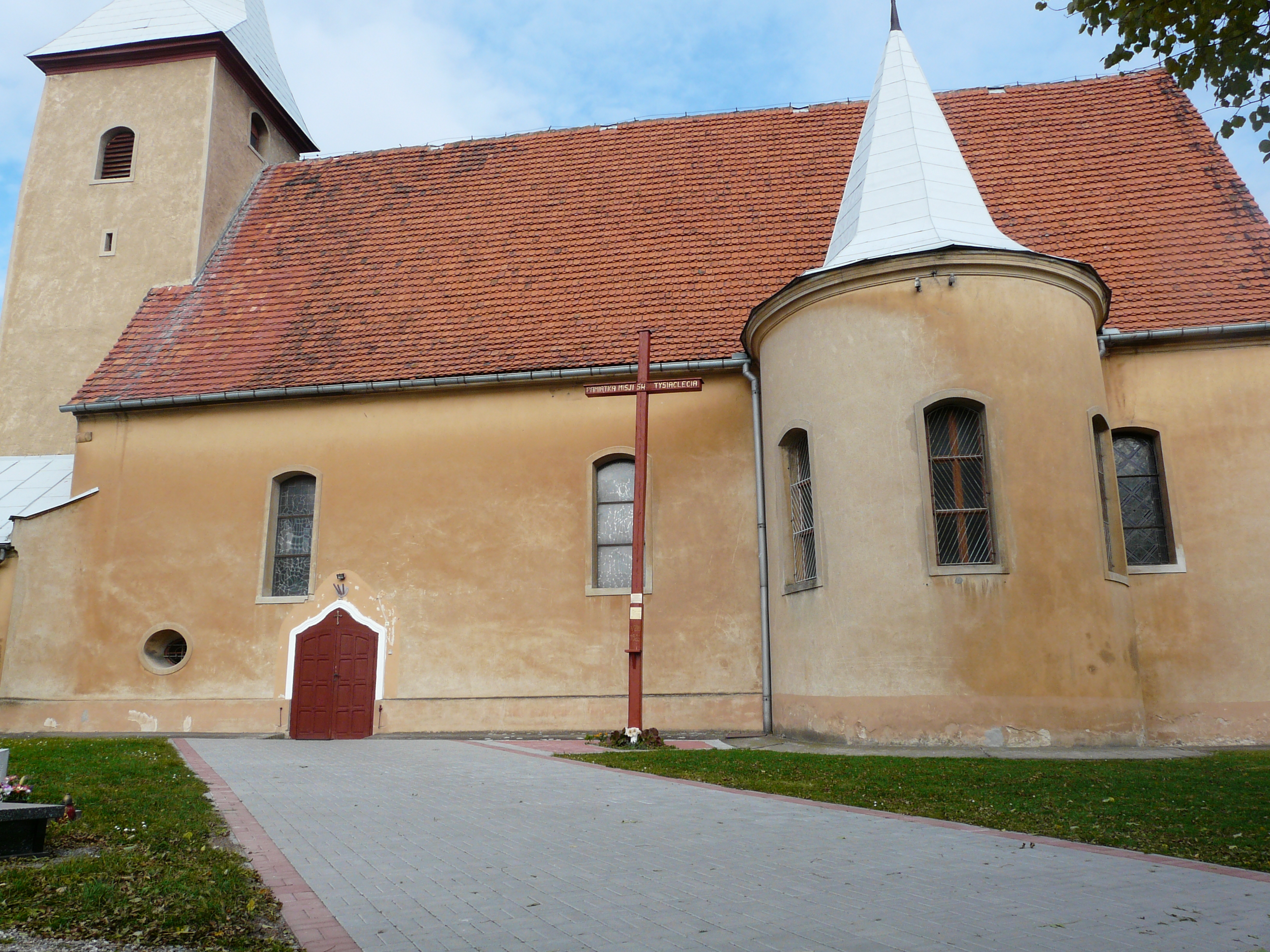
- Church of Saint Hedwig

- Location within Poland
- Coordinates: 50°43′19″N 16°45′40″E
- Country: Poland
- Voivodeship: Lower Silesian
- County: Dzierżoniów
- Gmina: Niemcza

Population
  - Total: 700

Gilów [ˈɡiluf] is a village in the administrative district of Gmina Niemcza, within Dzierżoniów County, Lower Silesian Voivodeship, in south-western Poland.
