= Ruszkowice, Lower Silesian Voivodeship =

Ruszkowice
- Village
- Location within Poland
- Coordinates: 50°41′33″N 16°52′07″E
- Country: Poland
- Voivodeship: Lower Silesian
- County: Dzierżoniów
- Gmina: Niemcza
- Elevation: 280 m (920 ft)
- Population: 40

Ruszkowice [ruʂkɔˈvit͡sɛ] is a village in the administrative district of Gmina Niemcza, within Dzierżoniów County, Lower Silesian Voivodeship, in south-western Poland.
