= Kietlin, Lower Silesian Voivodeship =

Kietlin
- Village
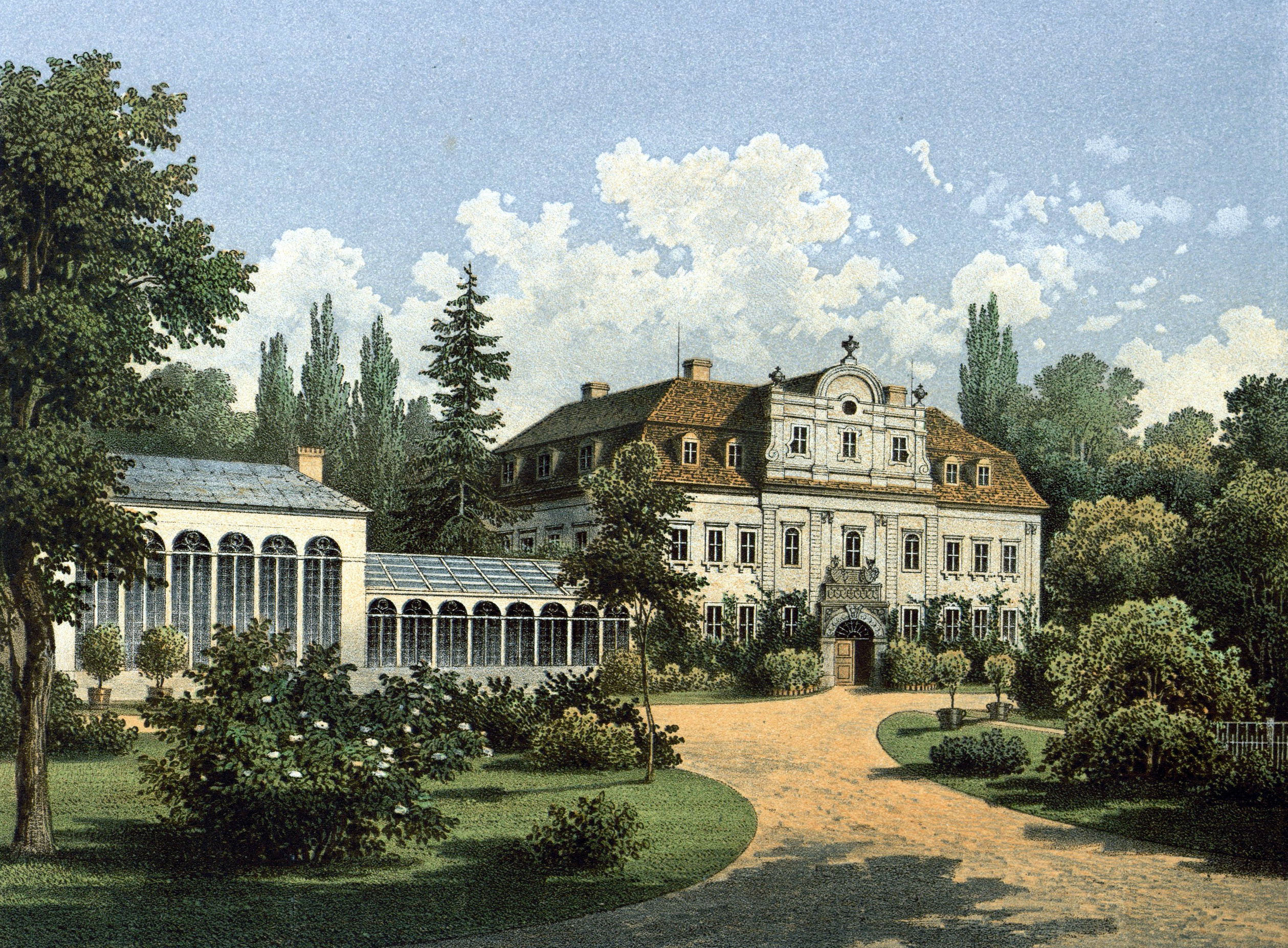
- Kietlin Palace

- Location within Poland
- Coordinates: 50°44′53″N 16°50′01″E
- Country: Poland
- Voivodeship: Lower Silesian
- County: Dzierżoniów
- Gmina: Niemcza
- Population: 250
- Time zone: UTC+1 (CET)
  - Summer (DST): UTC+2 (CEST)
- Vehicle registration: DDZ

Kietlin [ˈkʲɛtlin] is a village in the administrative district of Gmina Niemcza, within Dzierżoniów County, Lower Silesian Voivodeship, in south-western Poland.

Kietlin Palace is situated in the village.
