= University of Wrocław Botanical Garden =

Botanical garden in Wrocław, Poland

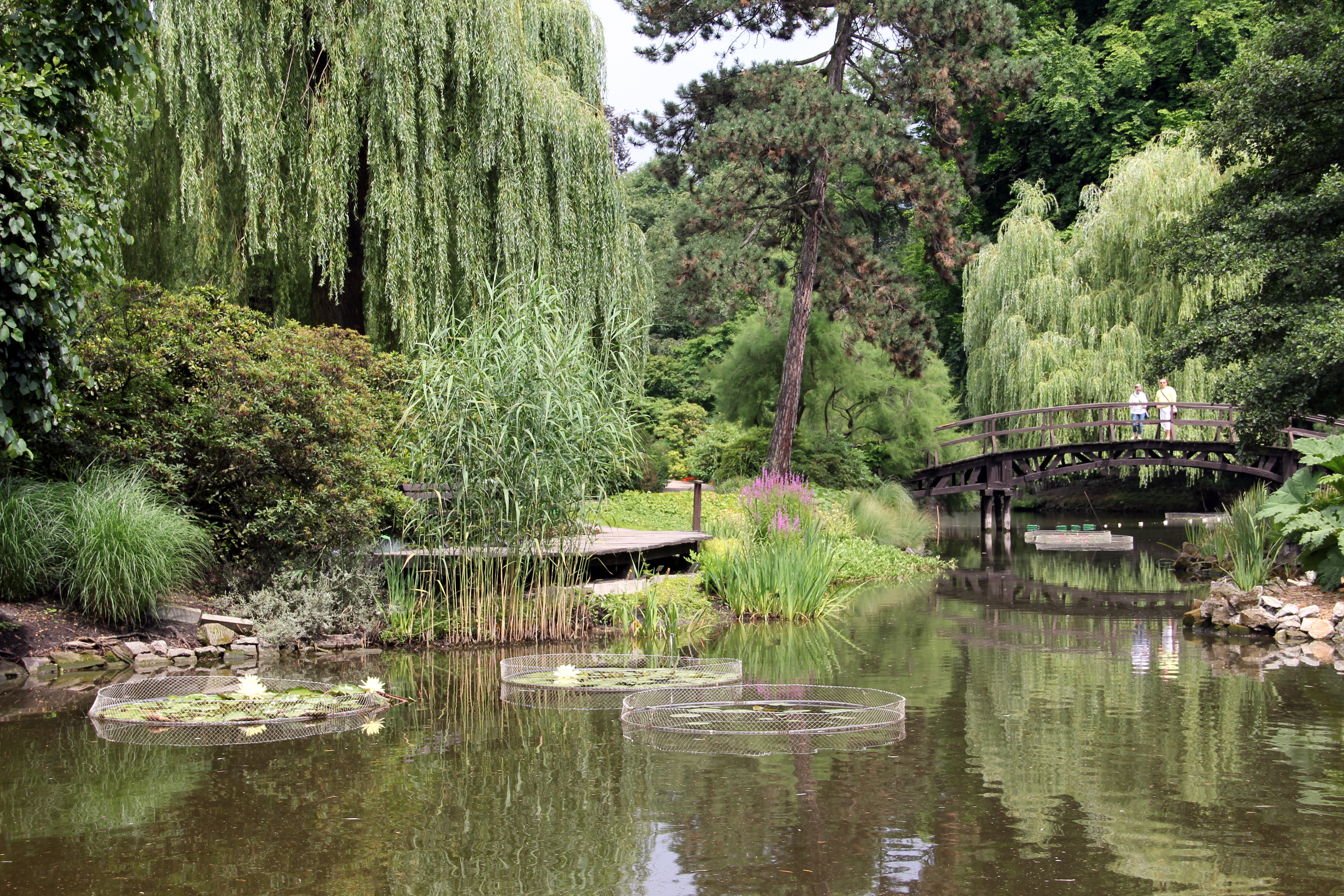
- Botanic Garden - Wroclaw
- Interactive map of University of Wrocław Botanical Garden
- Type: Botanical garden
- Location: ul. Henryka Sienkiewicza 23; 50-335 Wrocław
- Coordinates: 51°6′57.01″N 17°2′51.07″E
- Area: 7.4 hectares (74,000 m^{2})
- Created: 1811
- Operator: University of Wrocław
- Open: from April 5 to October 30
- Website: Official webpage (in Polish)

The Botanical Garden of the University of Wrocław is a botanical garden in Wrocław founded in 1811 in the area of Ostrów Tumski. The garden was established for medical students at the local university. During the Napoleonic Wars, the garden was damaged after the city fortifications were destroyed. Part of the garden featured a branch off the Odra river and was filled in during the conflict, but has since been restored as a large lily pond. It is the second oldest garden of this type in Poland, after the garden in Kraków. In 1974 it was listed as a protected monument in Lower Silesia, since 1994 it was included in the protected historical city center.

== Location ==
The Botanical Garden of the University of Wrocław is located on the north side of the Cathedral of St. John the Baptist and the Church of the Holy Cross, partly within the historic Ostrów Tumski, approx. 2 km from the Market Square.

== History ==
The garden initially occupied approximately 5 ha; its founders filled the role of directors in the years 1811–1816: systematist, anatomist and plant physiologist prof. Heinrich Friedrich Link and professor of natural history and agriculture Franz Heyde (Note: Identity of this person is difficult to establish. There is a second professor with the same name, from the same place and date who was a professor of experimental physics, see de:Franz_Paul_Scholz). The land used to be part of the fortified area and was donated to the University by the Prussian King Frederick William III. The botanical collection started with an order of 427 plants from gardener Liebig from Oleśnica.

From 1816 to 1830, the garden was managed by Ludolf Christian Treviranus, the younger brother of Gottfried Reinhold Treviranus and also a naturalist. His successor in the years 1830–1852 was the plant systematist Christian Gottfried Daniel Nees von Esenbeck, who was removed from his post for political reasons due to his activity during the Spring of Nations (1848–1849). In the years 1852–1883, when Johann Heinrich Robert Göppert was its director, the garden was expanded to include dendrology, palaeontology, physiognomic and geographic grouping, and the department of crop plants was expanded. At the end of his 32 years as a director, the garden had about 12,000 species and varieties of plants, most European orchids, 100 palms, 40 cycads and pandans. All plants were given permanent labels and the garden was open to visitors during weekdays.

After Göpper, the Garden was led by Adolf Engler (until 1889), Karl Prantl (until 1893), Ferdinand Pax (until 1926), Peter Stark (until 1928), and Johannes Buder (botanist) (until 1945). In 1933, the latter expanded the boundaries of the garden by about 1 ha to include the former cemetery at today's Hlonda and Wyszyńskiego Streets.

In 1945, during the siege of Festung Breslau by the Red Army, the collection of greenhouse plants and half of the garden's tree stand were completely destroyed. In the garden, the Germans set up anti-aircraft artillery positions, took air drops of supplies there and built numerous shelters with ammunition. Remains of this conflict were discovered when during the 1950s the bottom of the garden pond was cleaned and a considerable war-time arsenal was found.

For the first three years after the war, the restoration of the ruined garden was led by a botanist, prof. Stanisław Kulczyński, the first rector of the then combined University and University of Technology of Lwów. In 1948, the final decision was made to restart the Garden, entrusting this task to professors Henryk Teleżyński and Stefan Macka. In 1950, the garden was made available to the public – so far only on Sundays and public holidays. In the years 1958–1972 the garden was managed by doc. (later a professor) Zofia Gumińska. In 1958, the sappers cleared the pond and built an arched wooden bridge over it, which remains one of the symbols of this garden to this day. From this year on, the garden is open to the public on all days of the week. In 1960, another hectare of land was added to the Garden, from the side of the Holy Cross Street, where in 1967 a special pool for aquatic plants – water lilies – was built according to the design of architect Tadeusz Zipser. From 1972 to 1980 the garden was managed by prof. Krystyna Kukułczanka and at that time, in 1974, it was entered into the register of monuments of the Wrocław Province. Now, since 1994, together with the historical center of Wrocław surrounding it, it is recognized as a historical monument. Since 1981 the Garden has been headed by prof. Tomasz J. Nowak.

== Departments and collections ==
=== Overview ===
Currently, the area of the garden covers 7.4 ha (and 0.33 ha under glass) and there are about 7500 species of plants (11500 with varieties included), greenhouse and ground.

The trees are part of an arboretum and consists of bald cypress, giant sequoia, coast redwood, cedars, Japanese cedar, Cunninghamia lanceolata, European larch, dawn redwoods, Leyland cypress and Sciadopitys. Among these trees, 29 specimens were considered natural monuments.

The alpine garden displays a geological cross-section of the Wałbrzych hard coal deposits separated by sandstone and slate sediments, built in 1856. The exhibition includes fossilized prints of extinct plants, petrified tree trunks, etc.

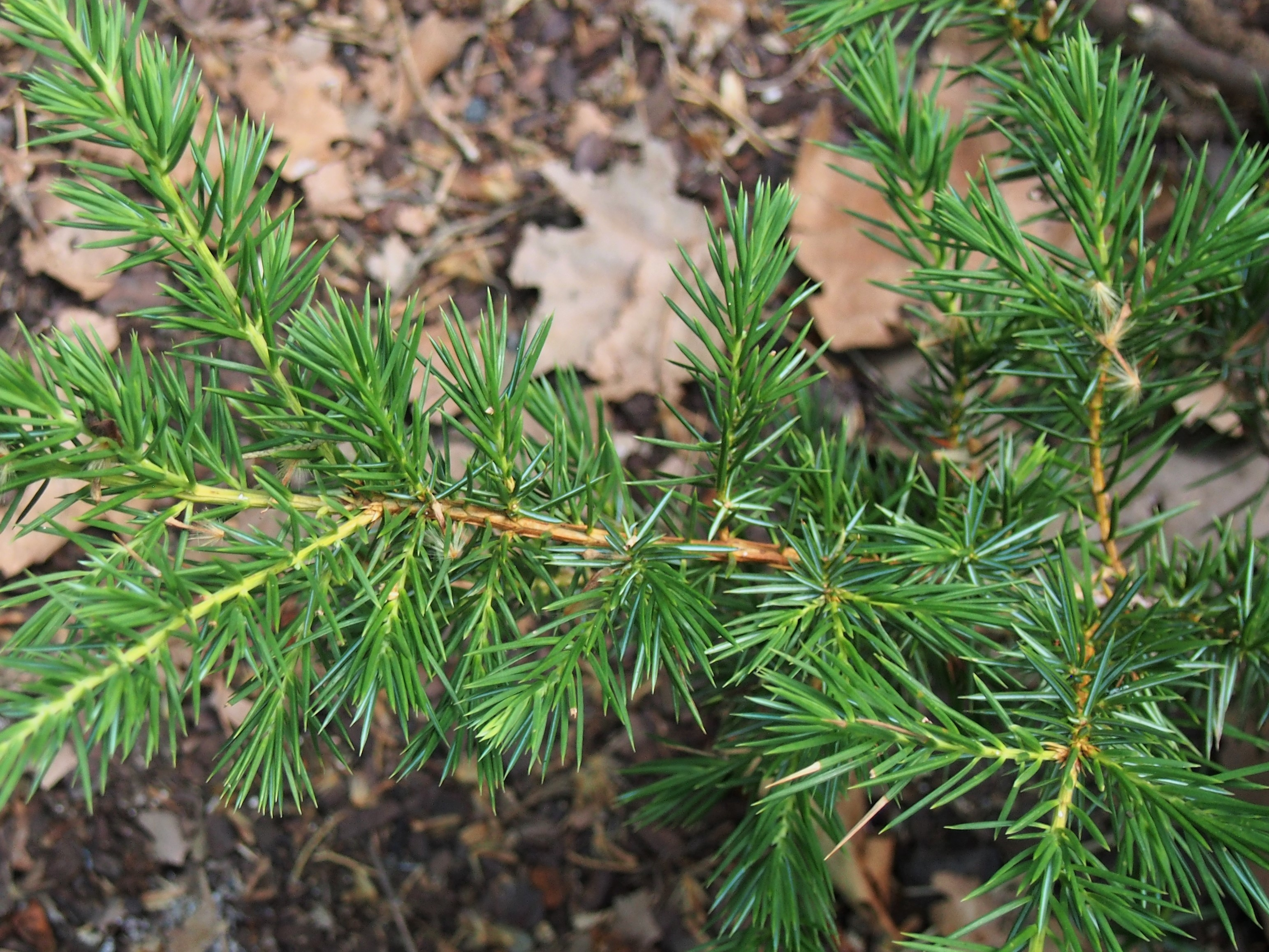
Juniperus conferta cultivated in the University of Wrocław Botanical Garden

Since 1988 the Arboretum in Wojsławice near Niemcza is a satellite garden of the Botanical Garden of the University of Wrocław. It covers an area of 65 ha and contains the biggest collections of Rhododendron and Hemerocallis species and cultivars in Poland, as well as many rare woody species, especially conifers.

=== Departments ===
- Ground ornamental plants – a section located in the western part of the Garden, was established in the 1960s to promote decorative horticultural plants. The collection includes hyacinths, narcissus, iris, peonies and daylilies.
- Systematics – covers an area of approximately 2 ha and located in the central part of the Wrocław Botanical Garden. Herbaceous plants as well as trees, shrubs and shrubs that can develop and winter in the climatic conditions of Poland.
- Arboretum – a section maintained as a park, both native and foreign species of trees and shrubs.
- Alpinarium – there are about 1500 species and varieties of cultivated rock plants. Its peculiarity is its geological profile.
- Water, mud and aquarium plants – one of the world's largest (over 250 taxa) collection of subtropical and tropical aquatic and mud plants.
- Greenhouse plants – The Wrocław greenhouse collection has a total of nearly 5,000 taxa and is one of the largest in Poland.
- Plant didactics and morphology – an exhibition of species that illustrate, among others, selected issues in the field of biology and morphology, ecology and geography of plants, allowing to learn about the structure of flowers and the methods of their pollination, types of fruit and methods of dispersing seeds, various types of inflorescences, shoots, leaves, roots and forms of plants.
- Climbers – the largest collection of wild climbing plants wintering in the ground in Europe, as well as horticultural varieties and species of annual climbing plants.
- Panorama of nature – a permanent exhibition presenting all the eras and their periods. The left side of the exhibition displays rocks and minerals from Lower Silesia. The main element of the right-hand side of the exhibition is a 36 x 2 m panoramic painting, a work by the famous painter from Wrocław, Janusz Merkel, which realistically depicts the development of life on Earth from the Cambrian to the Quaternary.
- Tissue culture laboratory
- Documentation department

== Directors and Managers of the Botanical Garden in Wrocław ==
List of directors over the history of the botanical garden:

- 1811–1815 – Heinrich Friedrich Link
- 1816–1830 – Ludolf Christian Treviranus
- 1830–1852 – Christian Gottfried Daniel Nees von Esenbeck
- 1852–1884 – Heinrich Göppert
- 1884–1889 – Adolf Engler
- 1889–1893 – Karl Anton Eugen Prantl
- 1893–1926 – Ferdinand Albin Pax
- 1927–1928 – Peter Stark
- 1929–1945 – Johannes Buder, the last German director of the botanical garden
- 1947–1957 – Stefan Macko (1889–1967), prof. Ph.D., palynologist, plant ecologist and geographer, the first post-war manager
- 1958–1972 – Zofia Gumińska (1917–2006), Ph.D., plant physiologist, pioneer of hydroponic cultivation in Poland, from 1948 rebuilding the Botanical Garden from war damage, manager
- 1972–1980 – Krystyna Kukułczanka (1925–2014), prof. PhD, plant physiologist, founder of the Laboratory of Tissue Cultures
- 1980–1981 – Mieczysław Tokarski (1926–1989), PhD, plant systematist
- 1981–2016 – Tomasz Jan Nowak (born 1949), dr hab., Prof. extra. University of Wrocław and Wrocław University of Environmental and Life Sciences, plant physiologist, dendrologist, social activist, head of the Botanical Garden since 1981, director since 1984.
- From 2016 – Ryszard Kamiński (acting director)

== Opening hours ==
The garden is open to visitors from April 5 to October 30, admission is paid.
