= Ligota Wielka =

Ligota Wielka may refer to the following places in Poland:

- Ligota Wielka, Dzierżoniów County in Lower Silesian Voivodeship (south-west Poland)
- Ligota Wielka, Oleśnica County in Lower Silesian Voivodeship (south-west Poland)
- Ligota Wielka, Kędzierzyn-Koźle County in Opole Voivodeship (south-west Poland)
- Ligota Wielka, Nysa County in Opole Voivodeship (south-west Poland)
