= Słupice =

Słupice may refer to the following places in Poland:

- Słupice, Lower Silesian Voivodeship (south-west Poland)
- Słupice, Opole Voivodeship (south-west Poland)
