= Gola Castle =

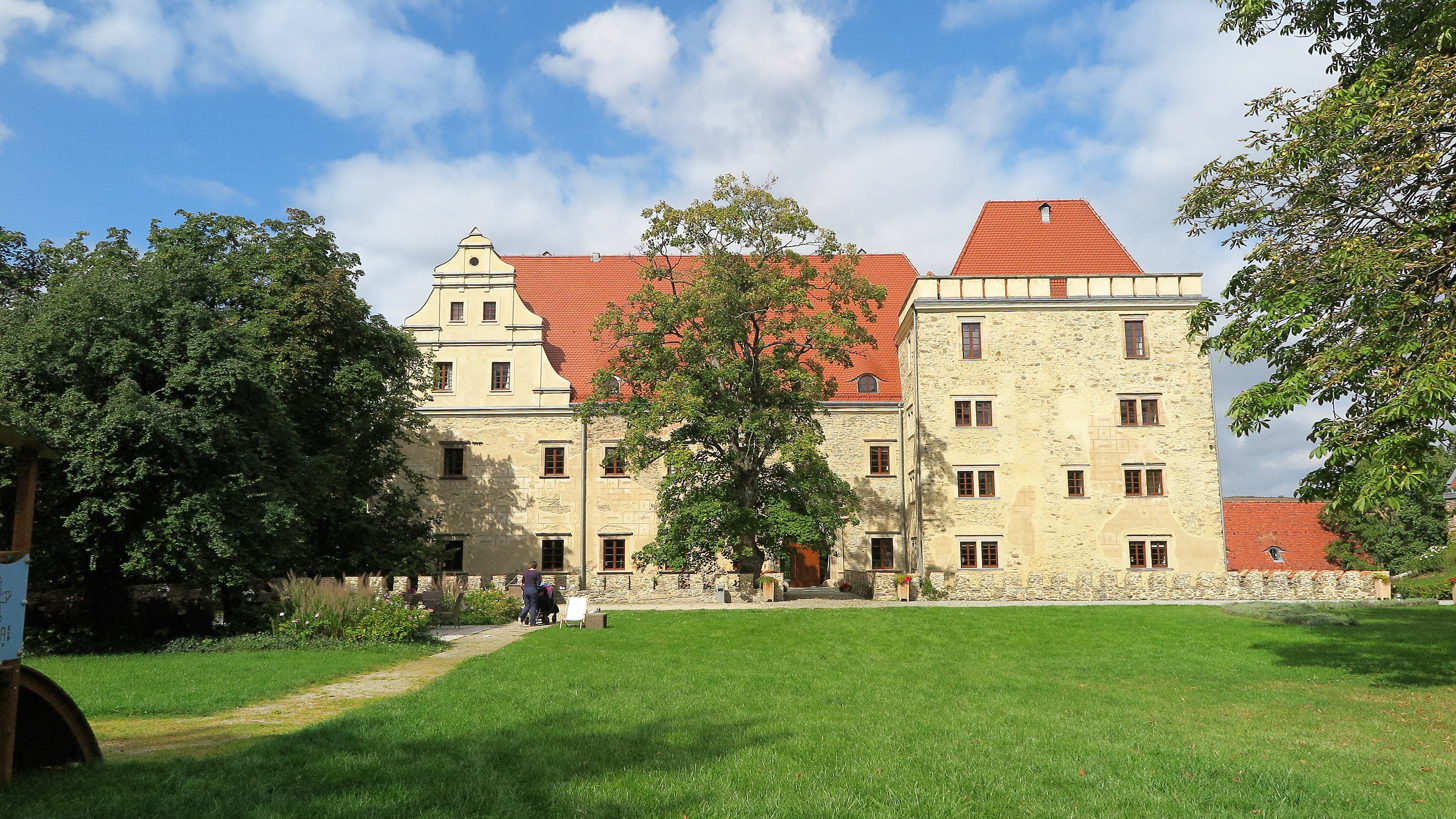

- Location within Poland Location within Lower Silesian Voivodeship
- Former names: Guhlau Schloss
- Alternative names: Gola Dzierżoniowska

General information
- Architectural style: Renaissance
- Location: Gola Dzierżoniowska, Dzierżoniów County, Poland
- Coordinates: 50°44′11″N 16°47′25″E
- Inaugurated: 1580
- Renovated: 2013

Website
- http://www.gola.pl

The Gola Castle (German: Schloss Guhlau) erected in the second half of the 16th century is situated in the village of Gola Dzierżoniowska, in Lower Silesian Voivodeship, south-western Poland. It is located 4 km north-west of Niemcza, 18 km east of Dzierżoniów, and 47 km south of the regional capital Wrocław.

== History ==
According to inscription above its main entrance, the Gola Castle was erected by Leonard von Rohnau beginning February 1580. The whole structure was built with granite rock. The original Renaissance-style edifice was enlarged in the years 1600–1610. It went through transformations at the beginning of the 18th century and was finally restored at the turn of the 20th century.

The Castle was partially destroyed in the 1945 bombardment and the last owners, the family von Prittwitz und Gaffron, were expelled after World War II. Thereafter, the Castle gradually fell into ruins. The wonderful Park surrounding the property also became dilapidated. However, both the Castle and Park are now under strict protection. Gola Castle is of special interest because it is one of the oldest and largest castles built in the Renaissance style in this region.

== Architecture ==
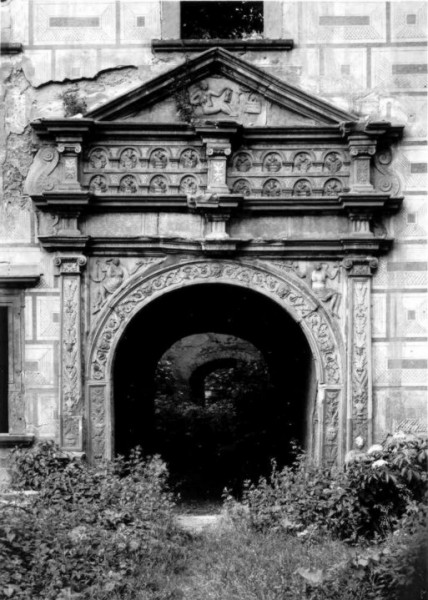
Portal and walls with sgraffito decoration of Gola Castle

The Renaissance Castle in Gola has been erected on a stone escarpment in 1580 by Leonard von Rohnau – this is confirmed by the German-language inscription over the main entrance: "IN GOTTES NAMEN. DEN 23. FEBRVAR ANNO 15 IM ACHZIGSTEN IAR LEONARD VON ROHNAV DES BAUES ANFANG MACHT VND DIES IAR VNDERS DACH VORBARCHT: GOTT SEI DANK" ("In the name of God Amen. On the 29th February 1580 Leonard von Rohnau started the construction and thanks to God covered it with a roof")

Most probably the Renaissance castle was built on the site of a more ancient middle age construction. The middle age castle had a defensive character, as shown by the steep escarpment on the western side, the wet moat from the east, and the double stone walls surrounding the edifice.

The Renaissance Castle has been built as a quadrilateral building with an interior courtyard. A 300-year-old linden still grows in the middle of the courtyard. At the beginning of the 17th century, the tower has been added to the initial construction on the eastern corner. From these days, the shape of the building remains untouched. The caste has a reconstructed portal and walls with sgraffito decoration.

== Park ==
Gola Park is below the level of the Castle. This 13-hectare Park features more than 1600 trees representing approximately 35 species from all over the world. A large water system irrigates the Park. The Gola river running through the Park waters seven of the ponds. The unique atmosphere created by the ponds and vegetation still remains today even as many of the ponds became overgrown over the years.

The Park has a very rich diversity of flora and fauna. The main path leading from the upper part of the Park where the Castle stands is surrounded by centenarian beech trees.

The latest inventory of flora in Gola Park was catalogued in Autumn 2001. The work was performed by the following team: Ewa Domaszewska, Artur Barcki and Cedric Gendaj.

1619 trees and 36 different species were collected and catalogued during this inventory. For a full version of the inventory and a detailed description of each tree, please have a look at reference file (only available in Latin and Polish)).

== Reconstruction ==
Intensive reconstruction work aiming to restitute the monument's historical value has been carried out since 2000 for several years. The work has been subsidized in 2007–08 from the "Cultural Heritage" program of Ministry of Culture and National Heritage (Poland).

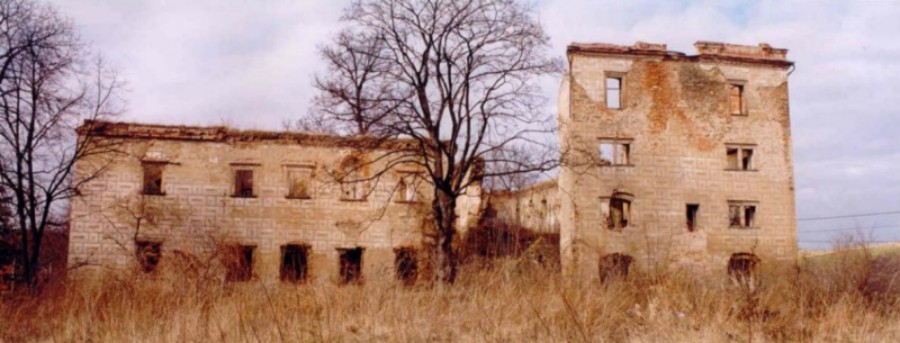
Initial condition

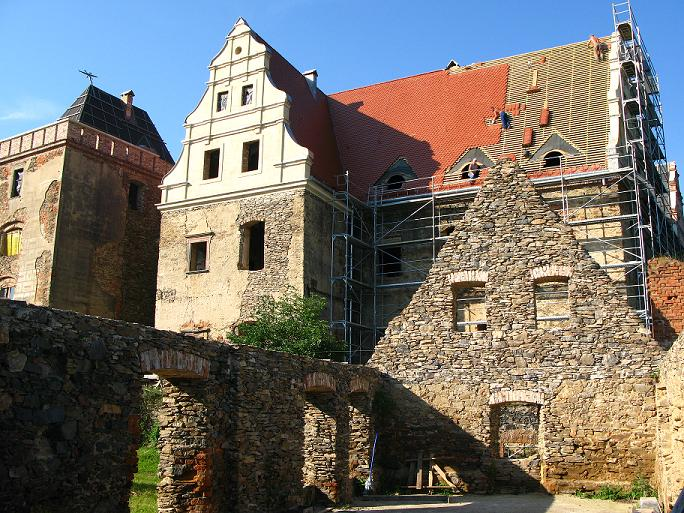
Reconstruction for which old photographs were utilized

== Hotel, Spa & Restaurant ==
In the summer of 2013, Gola Castle now owned by Marek Gendaj, became a luxury hotel, spa & restaurant called Uroczysko Siedmiu Stawów (7 Lakes' Sanctuary).

== Surroundings ==
Less than 20 km

- Wojsławice Arboretum
- Lake of Sieniawka - Beach, swimming, beach volley
- Medieval town of Niemcza
- Horseriding at Bielawa
- Aquapark Aquarius of Bielawa
- Cistercian monastery at Henryków

Less than 50 km

- Camp of Gross-Rosen
- Lower-Silesia Castles
- Grodno Castle, Kamieniec Ząbkowicki Castle, Krzyżowa Castle, Krasków Castle, Krobielowice Castle, Sobótka-Górka Castle
- Książ Castle, Horse stables of Książ, Palm house of Lubiechów
- Historical city of Kłodzko with its houses from 15th and 16th century, its fortress with 44 km de galleries & the bridge Saint-John from 1390
- Ski resort/mounting bike in Sokolec
- Spa resorts in Polanica-Zdrój & Szczawno-Zdrój
- Underground factories from World War II (Osówka, Walim)
- Trekking in Wielka Sowa, Mała Sowa and Mount Ślęża
- Market of Świdnica, and Church of Peace in Świdnica (listed as UNESCO World Heritage Site)
- Wrocław, with Centennial Hall (listed as UNESCO World Heritage Site), Market Square in Wrocław, Aula Leopoldina at Wrocław University

== See also ==
- Castles in Poland
