= Jaźwina =

- Village
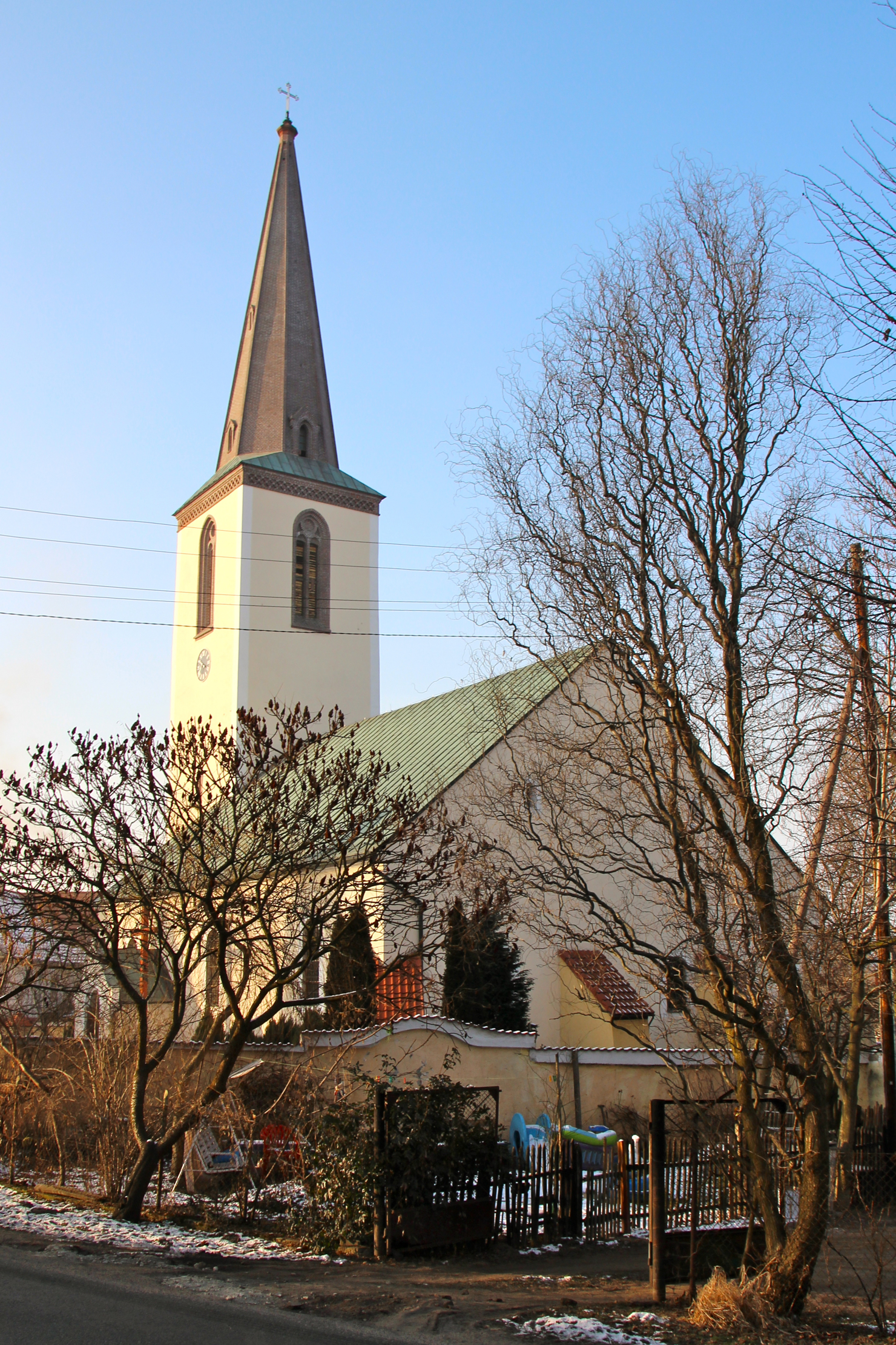

- Location within Poland
- Coordinates: 50°47′46″N 16°42′08″E
- Country: Poland
- Voivodeship: Lower Silesian
- County: Dzierżoniów
- Gmina: Łagiewniki
- Population: 700

Jaźwina [jaʑˈvina] is a village in the administrative district of Gmina Łagiewniki, within Dzierżoniów County, Lower Silesian Voivodeship, in south-western Poland.
