= Śmiałowice =

- Village
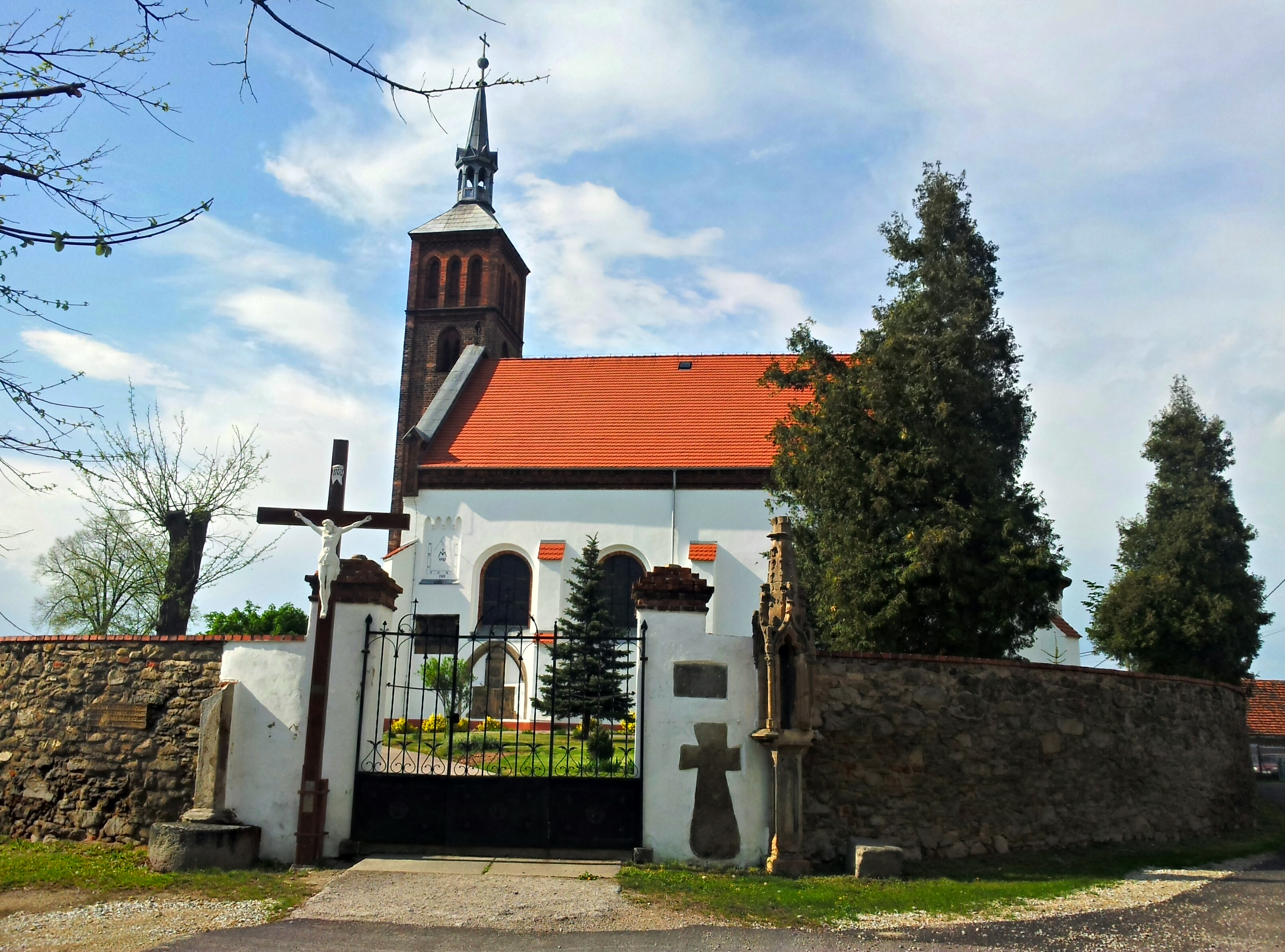
- Catholic church

- Location within Poland
- Coordinates: 50°54′N 16°33′E
- Country: Poland
- Voivodeship: Lower Silesian
- County: Świdnica
- Gmina: Marcinowice

Śmiałowice [ɕmjawɔˈvit͡sɛ] is a village in the administrative district of Gmina Marcinowice, within Świdnica County, Lower Silesian Voivodeship, in south-western Poland.
