= Stefanowice, Lower Silesian Voivodeship =

Stefanowice
- Village
- Location within Poland
- Coordinates: 50°53′23″N 16°32′59″E
- Country: Poland
- Voivodeship: Lower Silesian
- County: Świdnica
- Gmina: Marcinowice

Stefanowice [stɛfanɔˈvit͡sɛ] is a village in the administrative district of Gmina Marcinowice, within Świdnica County, Lower Silesian Voivodeship, in south-western Poland.
