= Radzików, Lower Silesian Voivodeship =

Radzików
- Village
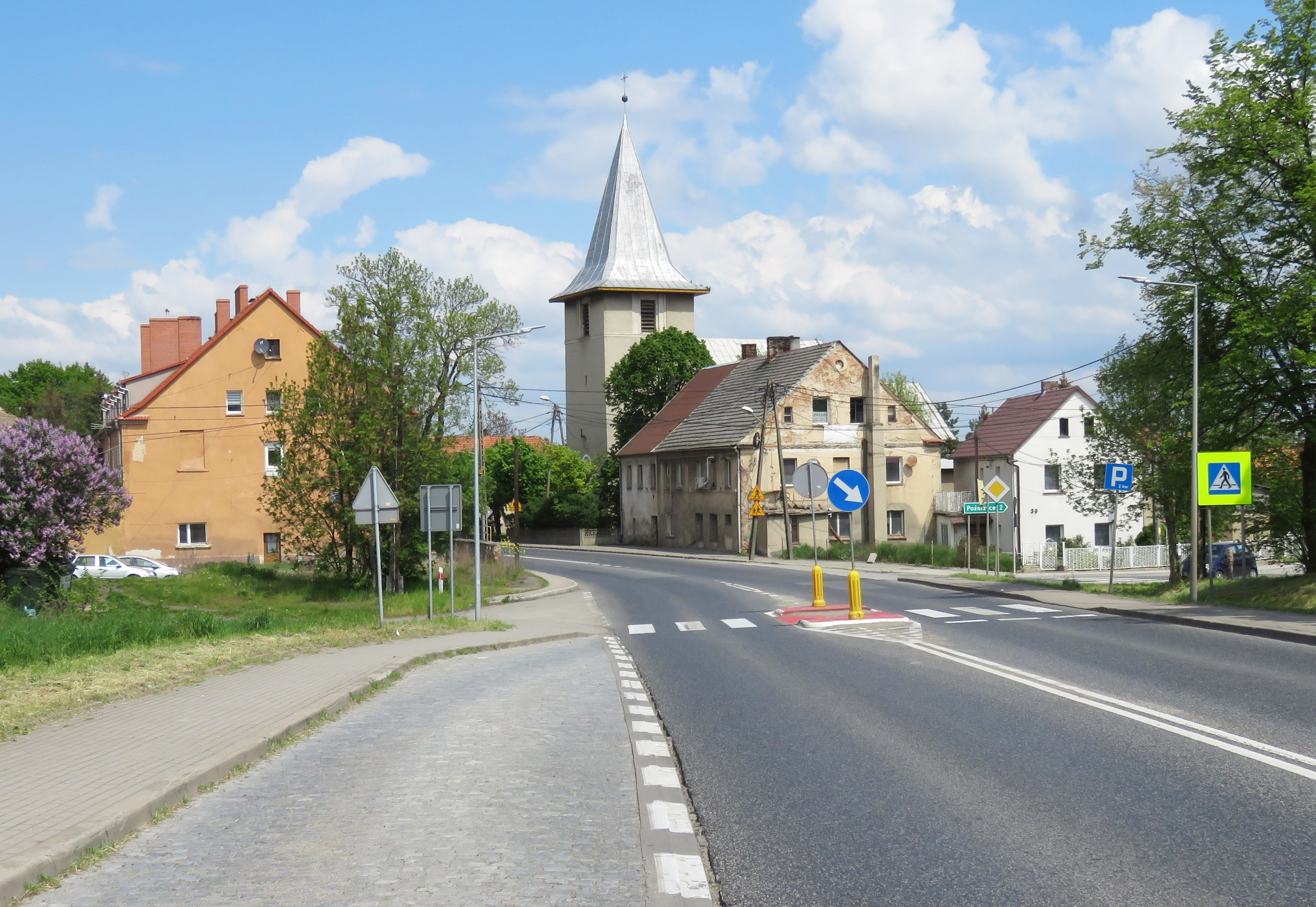

- Location within Poland
- Coordinates: 50°48′46″N 16°51′29″E
- Country: Poland
- Voivodeship: Lower Silesian
- County: Dzierżoniów
- Gmina: Łagiewniki
- Population: 350

Radzików [raˈd͡ʑikuf] is a village in the administrative district of Gmina Łagiewniki, within Dzierżoniów County, Lower Silesian Voivodeship, in south-western Poland.
