= Łagiewniki, Lower Silesian Voivodeship =

Łagiewniki
- Village
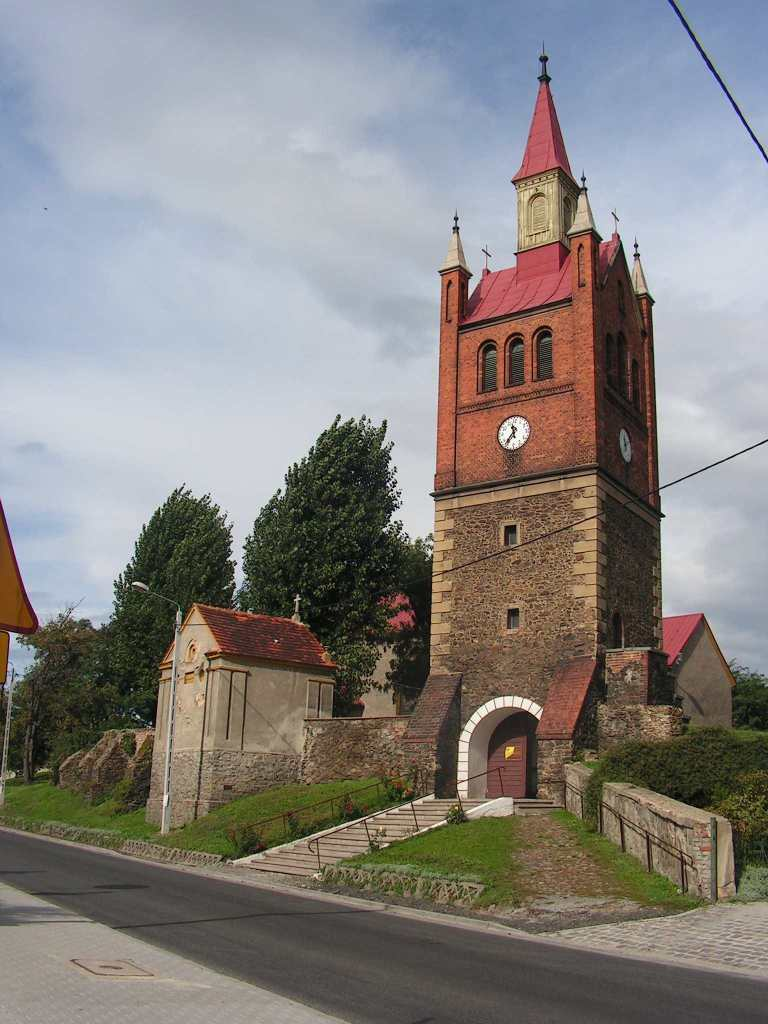
- Bell tower of the Church of Saint Joseph

- Location within Poland
- Coordinates: 50°47′28″N 16°50′39″E
- Country: Poland
- Voivodeship: Lower Silesian
- County: Dzierżoniów
- Gmina: Łagiewniki

Population
  - Total: 2,900
- Time zone: UTC+1 (CET)
  - Summer (DST): UTC+2 (CEST)
- Vehicle registration: DDZ
- Website: http://www.lagiewniki.pl/

Łagiewniki [waɡʲɛvˈɲikʲi] is a village in Dzierżoniów County, Lower Silesian Voivodeship, in south-western Poland. It is the seat of the administrative district (gmina) called Gmina Łagiewniki.

== History ==
In the final stages of World War II, on 25 January 1945, a German-organized death march of Allied prisoners of war from the Stalag Luft 7 POW camp passed through the village.

From 1975 to 1998 the village was in Wrocław Voivodeship.
