= Gmina Marcinowice =

Gmina Marcinowice Marcinowice Commune
- Gmina
- Flag Coat of arms
- Interactive map of Gmina Marcinowice
- Coordinates (Marcinowice): 50°52′N 16°35′E
- Country: Poland
- Voivodeship: Lower Silesian
- County: Świdnica
- Seat: Marcinowice
- Sołectwos: Biała, Chwałków, Gola Świdnicka, Gruszów, Kątki, Klecin, Krasków, Marcinowice, Mysłaków, Sady, Śmiałowice, Stefanowice, Strzelce, Szczepanów, Tąpadła, Tworzyjanów, Wirki, Wiry, Zebrzydów

Area
  - Total: 95.91 km^{2} (37.03 sq mi)

Population (2019-06-30)
  - Total: 6,488
  - Density: 67.65/km^{2} (175.2/sq mi)
- Website: https://www.marcinowice.pl

Gmina Marcinowice is a rural gmina (administrative district) in Świdnica County, Lower Silesian Voivodeship, in south-western Poland. Its seat is the village of Marcinowice, which lies approximately 12 kilometres (7 mi) east of Świdnica and 44 km (27 mi) south-west of the regional capital Wrocław.

The gmina covers an area of 95.91 square kilometres (37.0 sq mi), and as of 2019 its total population was 6,488.

== Neighbouring gminas ==
Gmina Marcinowice is bordered by the gminas of Dzierżoniów, Łagiewniki, Mietków, Sobótka, Świdnica and Żarów.

== Villages ==
The gmina contains the villages of Biała, Chwałków, Gola Świdnicka, Gruszów, Kątki, Klecin, Krasków, Marcinowice, Mysłaków, Sady, Śmiałowice, Stefanowice, Strzelce, Szczepanów, Tąpadła, Tworzyjanów, Wirki, Wiry and Zebrzydów.

== Twin towns – sister cities ==
Gmina Marcinowice is twinned with:

- Tanvald, Czech Republic
