= Uliczno =

- Village
- Location within Poland
- Coordinates: 50°48′35″N 16°43′19″E
- Country: Poland
- Voivodeship: Lower Silesian
- County: Dzierżoniów
- Gmina: Łagiewniki
- Population: 22

Uliczno [uˈlit͡ʂnɔ] is a village in the administrative district of Gmina Łagiewniki, within Dzierżoniów County, Lower Silesian Voivodeship, in south-western Poland.
