= Zebrzydów =

- Village
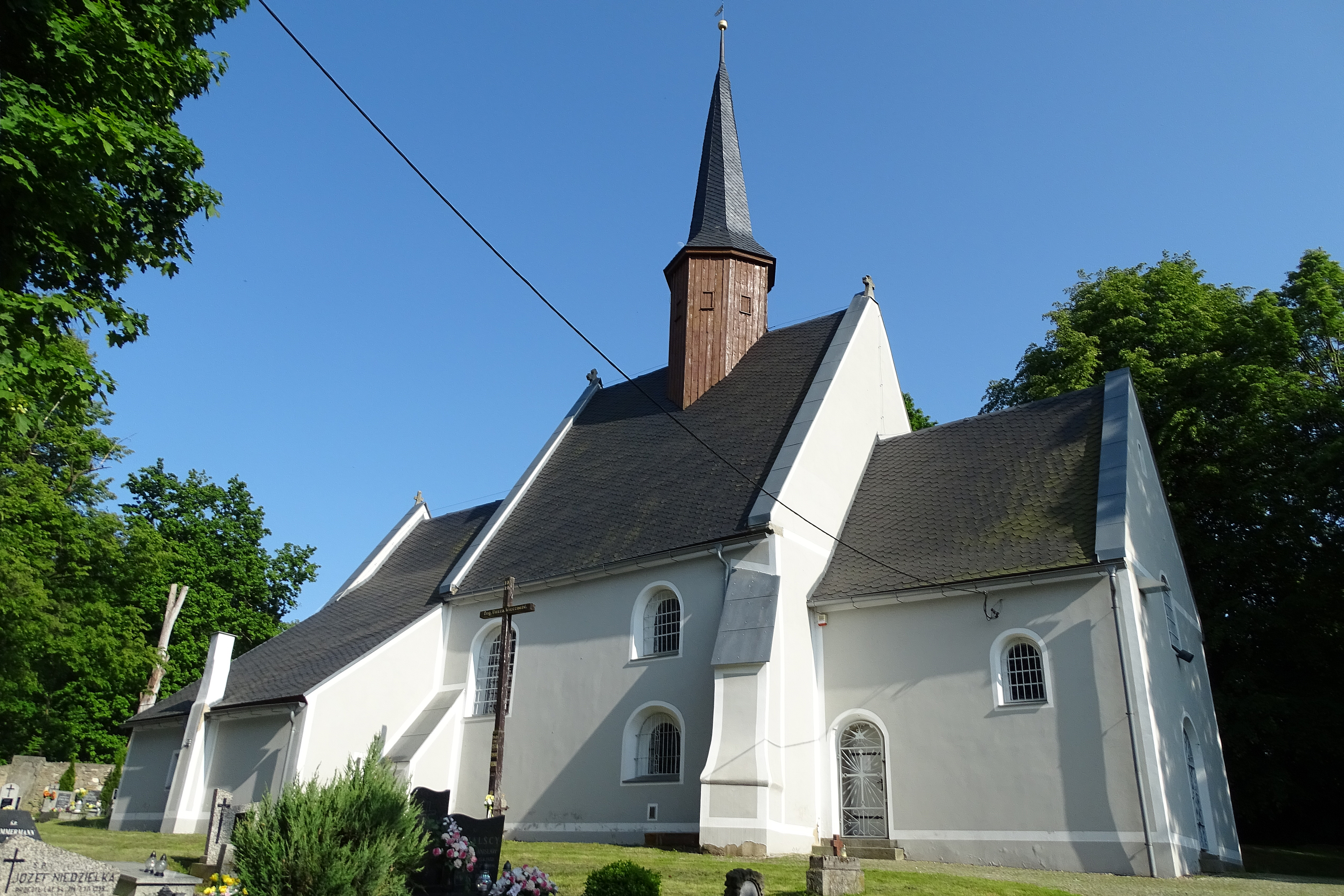
- Our Lady of the Scapular church in Zebrzydów

- Location within Poland
- Coordinates: 50°53′N 16°37′E
- Country: Poland
- Voivodeship: Lower Silesian
- County: Świdnica
- Gmina: Marcinowice

Zebrzydów [zɛˈbʐɨduf] is a village in the administrative district of Gmina Marcinowice, within Świdnica County, Lower Silesian Voivodeship, in south-western Poland.

== History ==
When it was part of medieval Piast-ruled Poland, Zebrzydów was mentioned in 1193 as an endowment of the Canons Regular Monastery in Wrocław. Later on, it also passed to Bohemia, Hungary, Prussia and Germany, before it became again part of Poland after Germany's defeat in World War II in 1945.
