= Klecin =

- Village
- Location within Poland
- Coordinates: 50°53′55″N 16°34′08″E
- Country: Poland
- Voivodeship: Lower Silesian
- County: Świdnica
- Gmina: Marcinowice
- Population: 170

Klecin [ˈklɛt͡ɕin] is a village in the administrative district of Gmina Marcinowice, within Świdnica County, Lower Silesian Voivodeship, in south-western Poland.
