= Tworzyjanów =

- Village
- Location within Poland
- Coordinates: 50°53′N 16°43′E
- Country: Poland
- Voivodeship: Lower Silesian
- County: Świdnica
- Gmina: Marcinowice

Tworzyjanów [tfɔʐɨˈjanuf] is a village in the administrative district of Gmina Marcinowice, within Świdnica County, Lower Silesian Voivodeship, in south-western Poland.
