= Szczepanów, Świdnica County =

Szczepanów
- Village
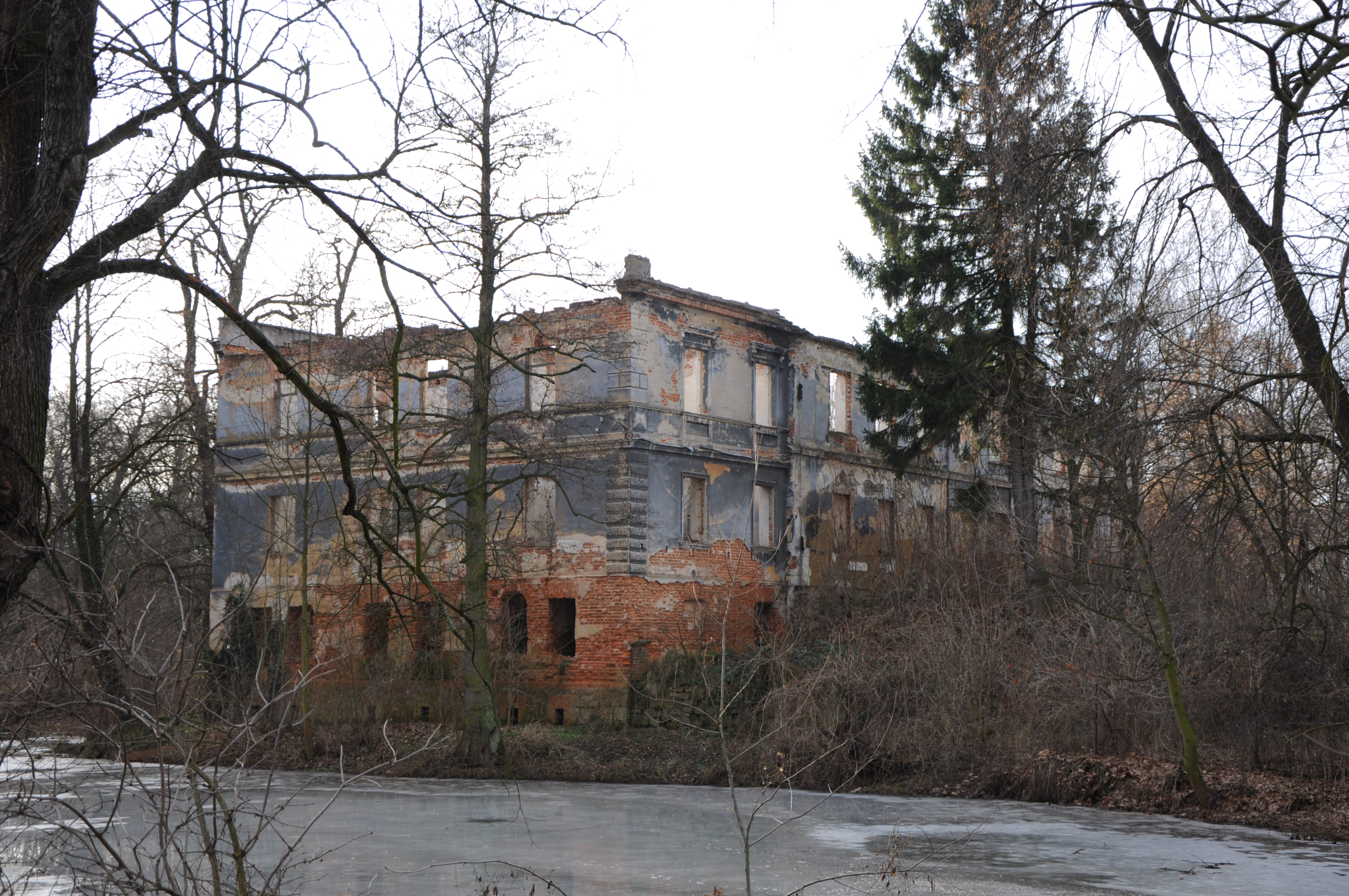
- Palace

- Location within Poland
- Coordinates: 50°54′N 16°38′E
- Country: Poland
- Voivodeship: Lower Silesian
- County: Świdnica
- Gmina: Marcinowice

Szczepanów [ʂt͡ʂɛˈpanuf] is a village in the administrative district of Gmina Marcinowice, within Świdnica County, Lower Silesian Voivodeship, in south-western Poland.
