= Gola Dzierżoniowska =

- Village
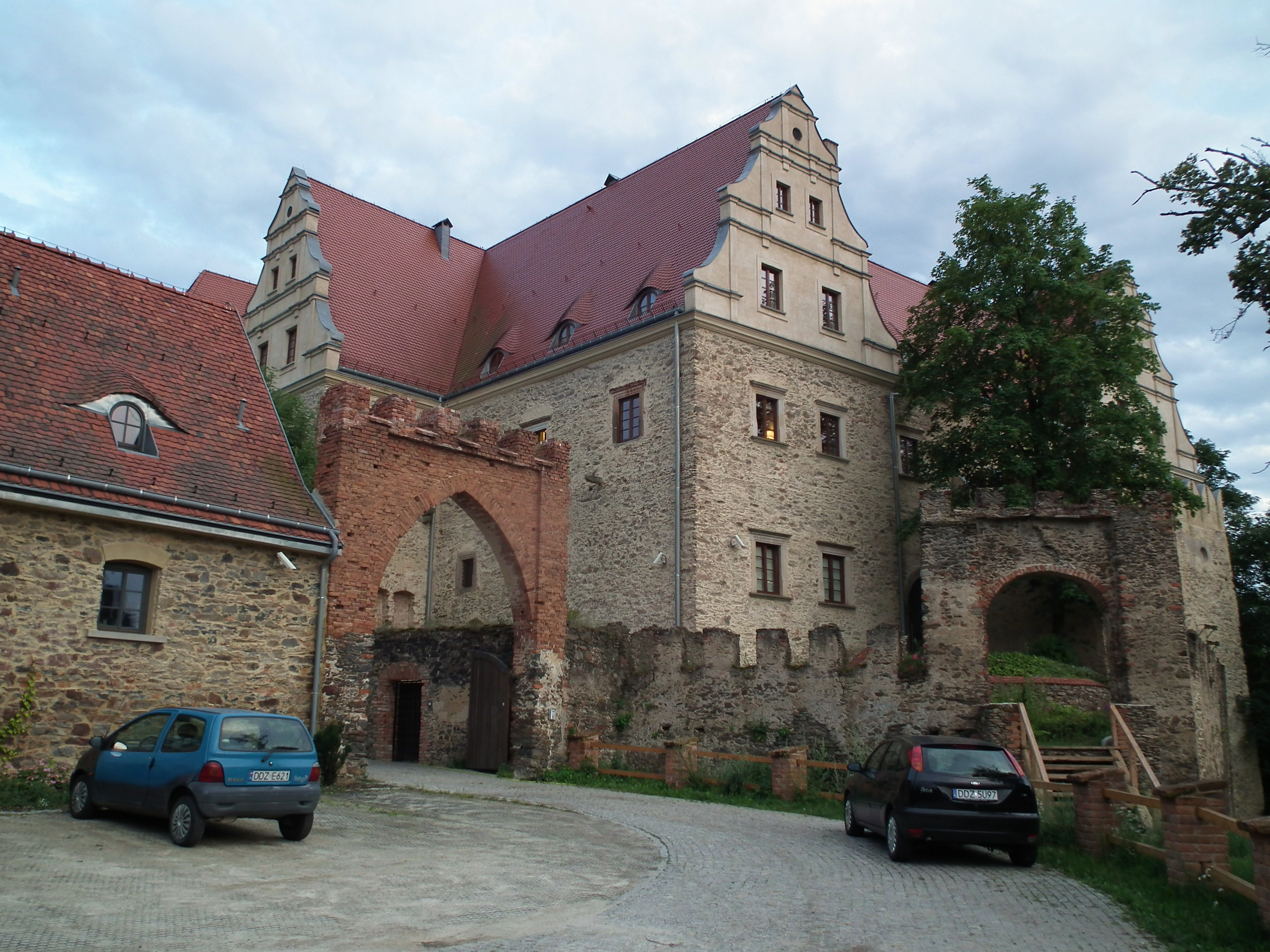
- Gola Castle after renovation

- Location within Poland
- Coordinates: 50°44′18″N 16°47′33″E
- Country: Poland
- Voivodeship: Lower Silesian
- County: Dzierżoniów
- Gmina: Niemcza
- Population: 150

Gola Dzierżoniowska [ˈɡɔla d͡ʑɛrʐɔˈɲɔfska], abbreviated to Gola, is a village in the administrative district of Gmina Niemcza, within Dzierżoniów County, Lower Silesian Voivodeship, in south-western Poland.

Gola Dzierżoniowska Castle is situated in the village.
