= Tąpadła =

- Village
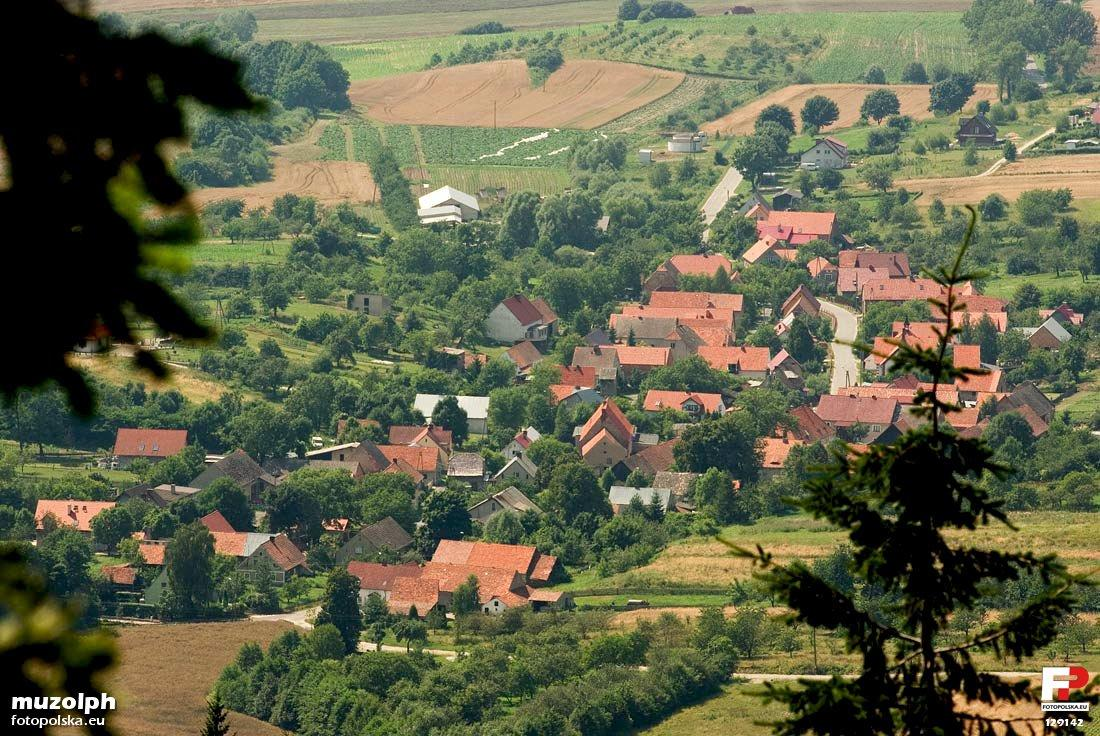

- Location within Poland
- Coordinates: 50°50′N 16°40′E
- Country: Poland
- Voivodeship: Lower Silesian
- County: Świdnica
- Gmina: Marcinowice

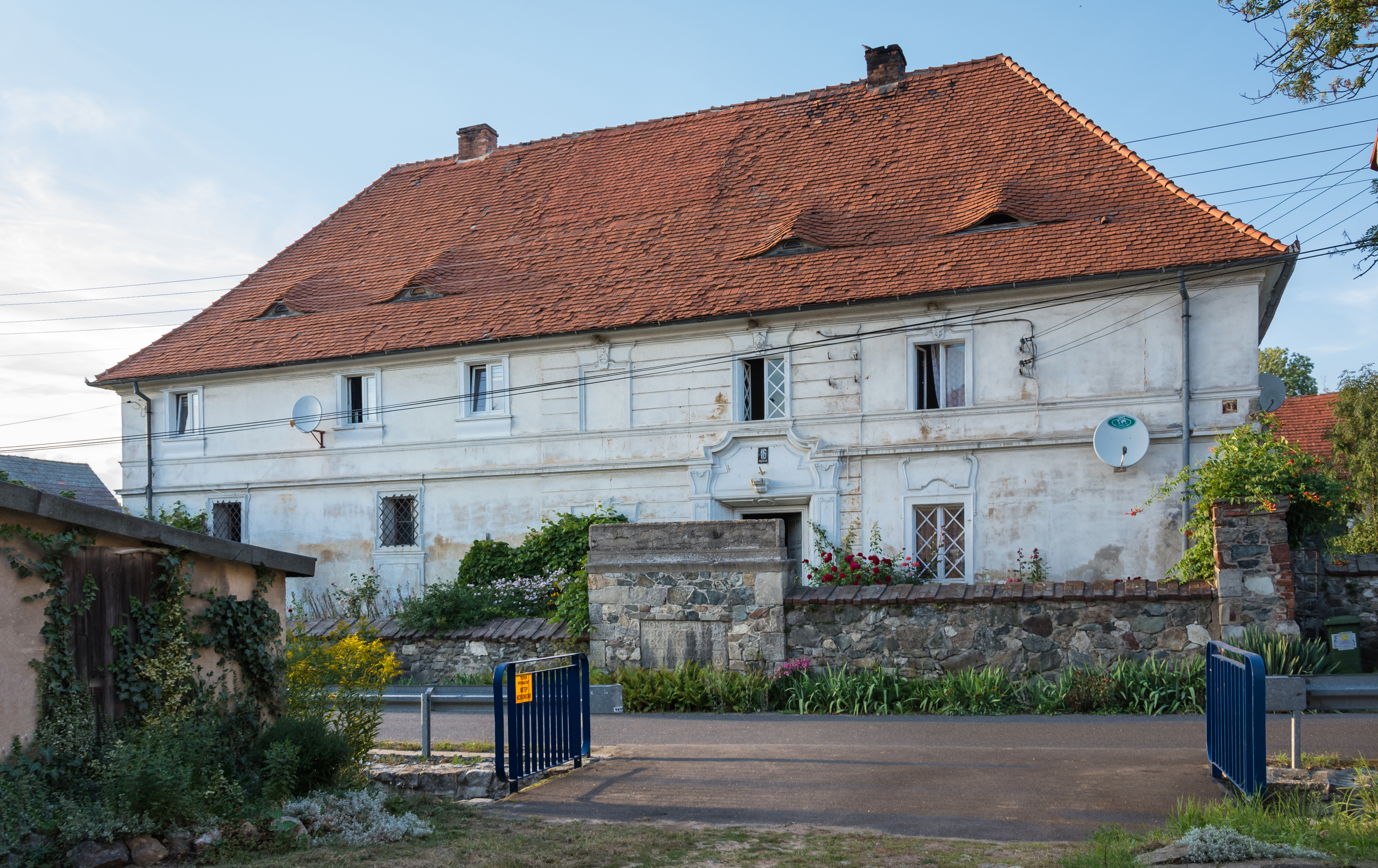
Manor in Tąpadła

Tąpadła (Polish pronunciation: [tɔmˈpadwa]) is a village in the administrative district of Gmina Marcinowice, within Świdnica County, Lower Silesian Voivodeship, in south-western Poland.
