= Strzelce, Świdnica County =

Strzelce
- Village
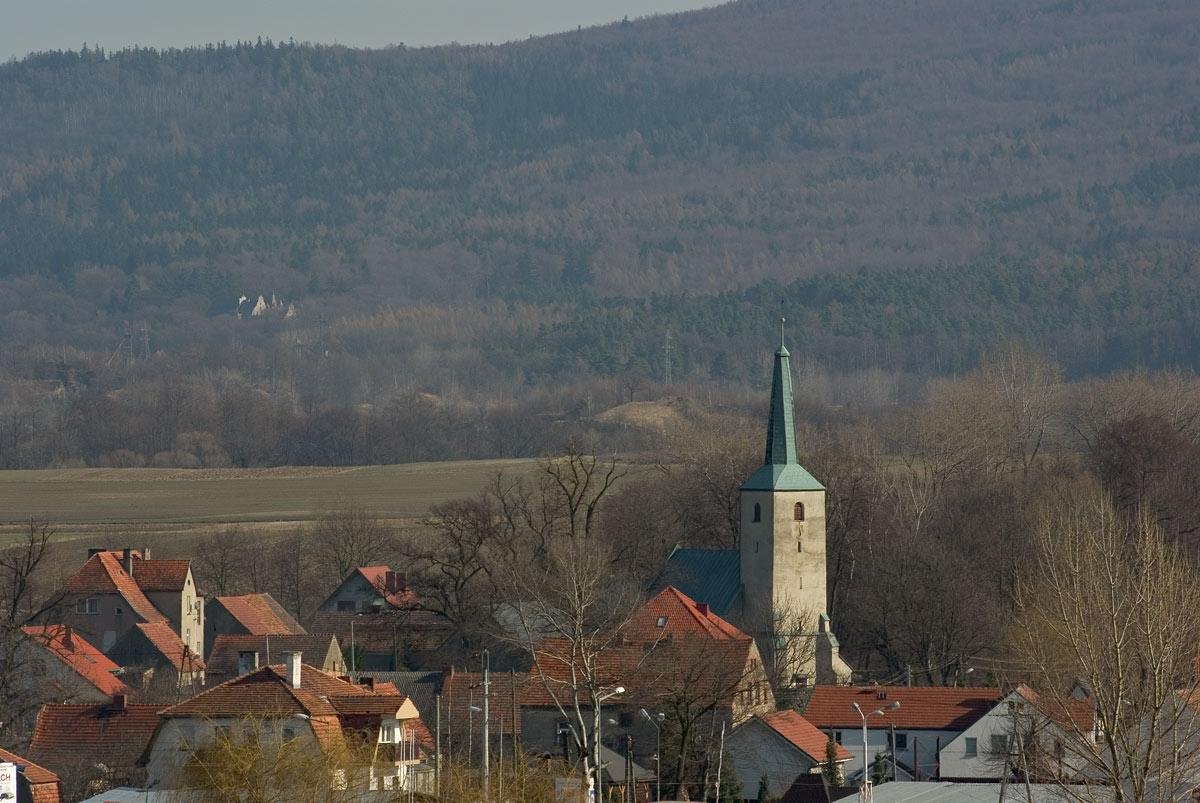

- Location within Poland
- Coordinates: 50°55′N 16°40′E
- Country: Poland
- Voivodeship: Lower Silesian
- County: Świdnica
- Gmina: Marcinowice
- First mentioned: 1193
- Vehicle registration: DSW

Strzelce [ˈstʂɛlt͡sɛ] is a village in the administrative district of Gmina Marcinowice, within Świdnica County, Lower Silesian Voivodeship, in south-western Poland.

== History ==
When it was part of medieval Piast-ruled Poland, in 1193, the village was mentioned under the name Strelce as an endowment of the Canons Regular Monastery in Wrocław. In 1204, it was mentioned under the Old Polish name Strelovo. The name of the village is of Polish origin and comes from the old Polish word strzelec, which means "hunter" or "archer".

In 1885, the village had a population of 675.

During World War I, the Germans operated a forced labour camp for Allied prisoners of war in the village.
