= Domaszów =

- Village
- Location within Poland
- Coordinates: 50°48′57″N 16°46′32″E
- Country: Poland
- Voivodeship: Lower Silesian
- County: Dzierżoniów
- Gmina: Łagiewniki
- Population: 8

Domaszów [dɔˈmaʂuf] is a village in the administrative district of Gmina Łagiewniki, within Dzierżoniów County, Lower Silesian Voivodeship, in south-western Poland.
