= Ratajno =

- Village
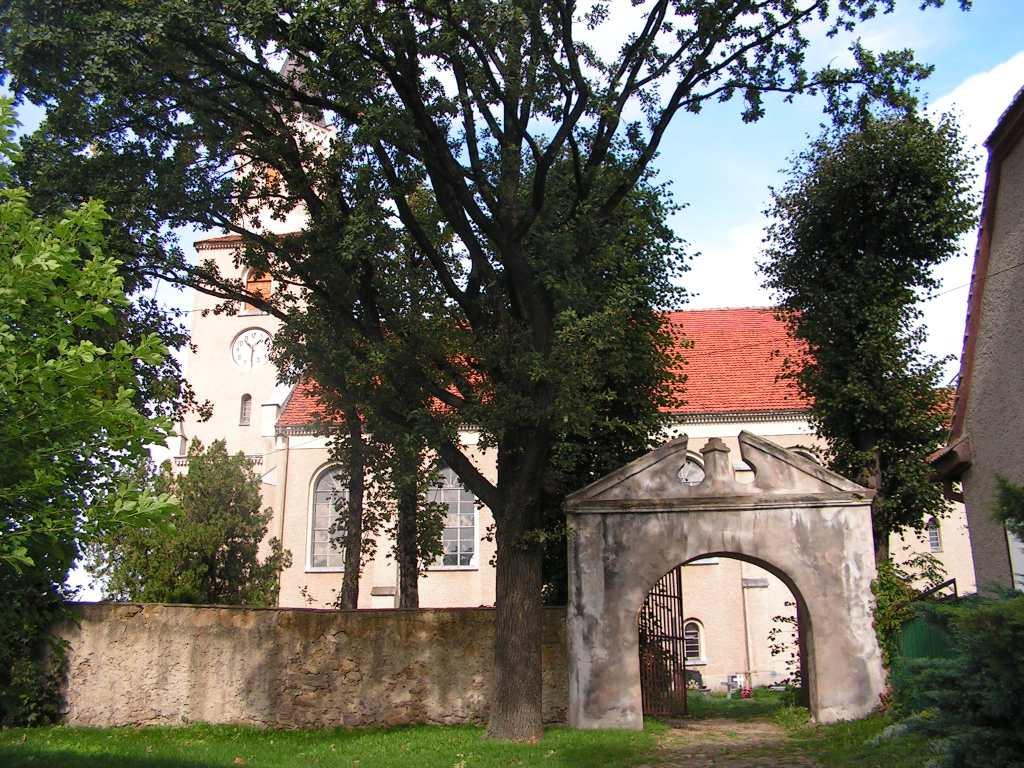

- Location within Poland
- Coordinates: 50°46′50″N 16°48′20″E
- Country: Poland
- Voivodeship: Lower Silesian
- County: Dzierżoniów
- Gmina: Łagiewniki
- Population: 250

Ratajno [raˈtai̯nɔ] is a village in the administrative district of Gmina Łagiewniki, within Dzierżoniów County, Lower Silesian Voivodeship, in south-western Poland.
