= Janczowice =

- Village
- Location within Poland
- Coordinates: 50°47′10″N 16°44′37″E
- Country: Poland
- Voivodeship: Lower Silesian
- County: Dzierżoniów
- Gmina: Łagiewniki

Janczowice [jant͡ʂɔˈvit͡sɛ] is a village in the administrative district of Gmina Łagiewniki, within Dzierżoniów County, Lower Silesian Voivodeship, in south-western Poland.
