= Mysłaków, Lower Silesian Voivodeship =

Mysłaków
- Village
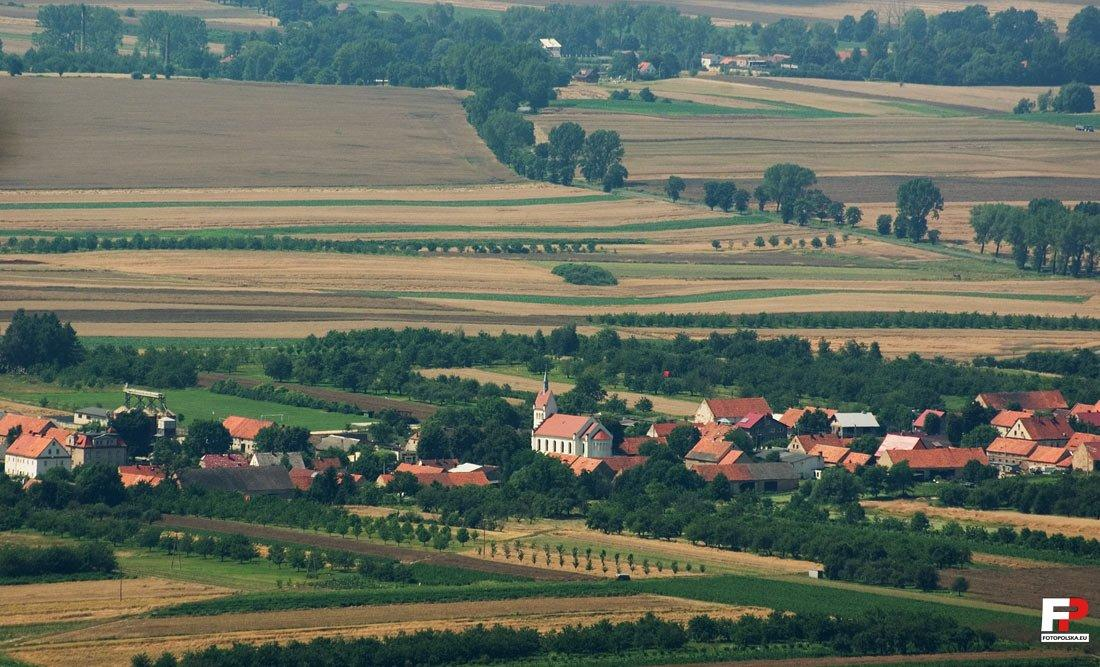

- Location within Poland
- Coordinates: 50°52′N 16°39′E
- Country: Poland
- Voivodeship: Lower Silesian
- County: Świdnica
- Gmina: Marcinowice

Mysłaków [mɨˈswakuf] (German: Matzlowitz) is a village in the administrative district of Gmina Marcinowice, within Świdnica County, Lower Silesian Voivodeship, in south-western Poland.
