= Chwałków =

- Village
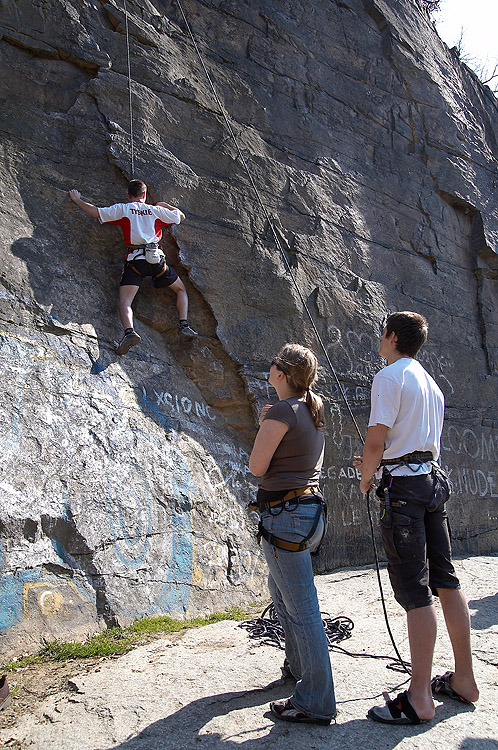
- Guide climbing the quarry in Chwałkowie

- Location within Poland
- Coordinates: 50°53′43″N 16°40′54″E
- Country: Poland
- Voivodeship: Lower Silesian
- County: Świdnica
- Gmina: Marcinowice

Chwałków [ˈxfau̯kuf] is a village in the administrative district of Gmina Marcinowice, within Świdnica County, Lower Silesian Voivodeship, in south-western Poland.
