= Marcinowice, Świdnica County =

Marcinowice
- Village
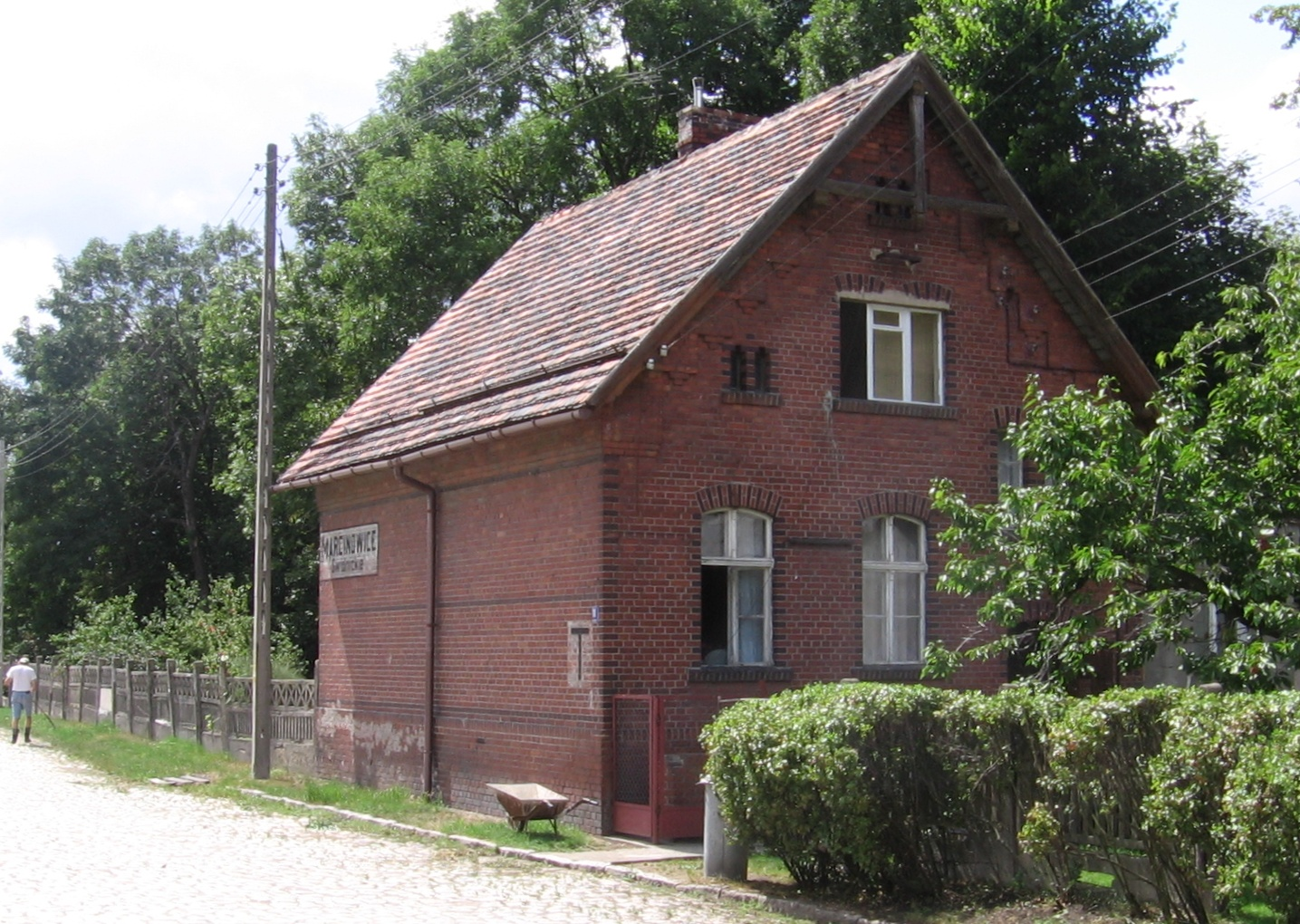

- Location within Poland
- Coordinates: 50°52′N 16°35′E
- Country: Poland
- Voivodeship: Lower Silesian
- County: Świdnica
- Gmina: Marcinowice

Marcinowice [mart͡ɕinɔˈvʲit͡sɛ] is a village in Świdnica County, Lower Silesian Voivodeship, in south-western Poland. It is the seat of the administrative district (gmina) called Gmina Marcinowice.
