= Trzebnik =

- Village
- Location within Poland
- Coordinates: 50°49′N 16°53′E
- Country: Poland
- Voivodeship: Lower Silesian
- County: Dzierżoniów
- Gmina: Łagiewniki
- Population: 100

Trzebnik [ˈtʂɛbnik] is a village in the administrative district of Gmina Łagiewniki, within Dzierżoniów County, Lower Silesian Voivodeship, in south-western Poland.
