= Sady, Lower Silesian Voivodeship =

Sady
- Village
- Location within Poland
- Coordinates: 50°53′N 16°40′E
- Country: Poland
- Voivodeship: Lower Silesian
- County: Świdnica
- Gmina: Marcinowice

Sady [ˈsadɨ] is a village in the administrative district of Gmina Marcinowice, within Świdnica County, Lower Silesian Voivodeship, in south-western Poland.
