= Wiry, Lower Silesian Voivodeship =

Wiry
- Village
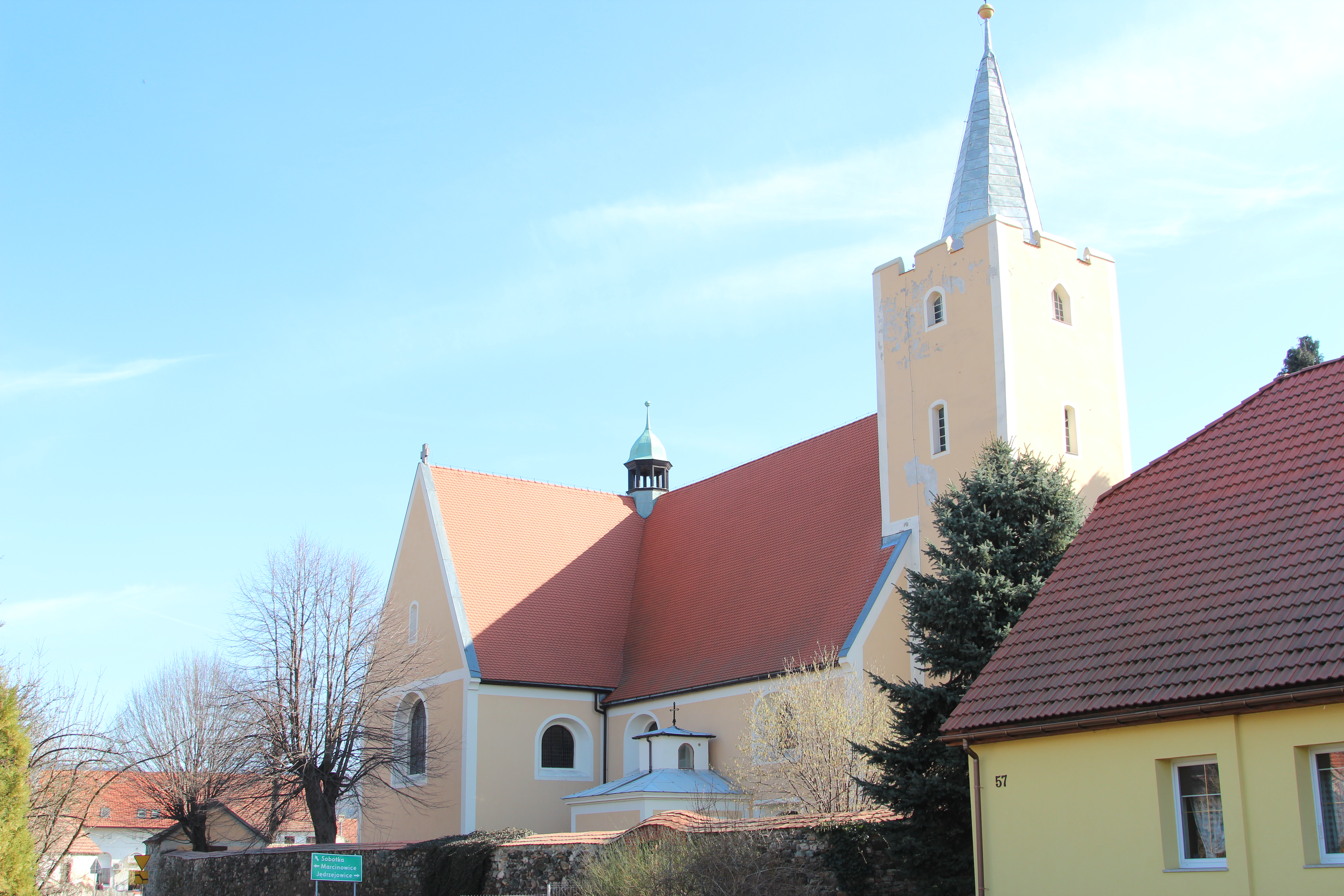
- Saint Michael Archangel church in Wiry

- Location within Poland
- Coordinates: 50°51′N 16°39′E
- Country: Poland
- Voivodeship: Lower Silesian
- County: Świdnica
- Gmina: Marcinowice
- Time zone: UTC+1 (CET)
  - Summer (DST): UTC+2 (CEST)
- Vehicle registration: DSW

Wiry [ˈvirɨ] is a village in the administrative district of Gmina Marcinowice, within Świdnica County, Lower Silesian Voivodeship, in south-western Poland.

== History ==
When it was part of medieval Piast-ruled Poland, Wiry was mentioned in 1193 as an endowment of the Canons Regular Monastery in Wrocław. The name of the village is of Polish origin and comes from the old Polish word wir.
