= Stoszów =

- Village
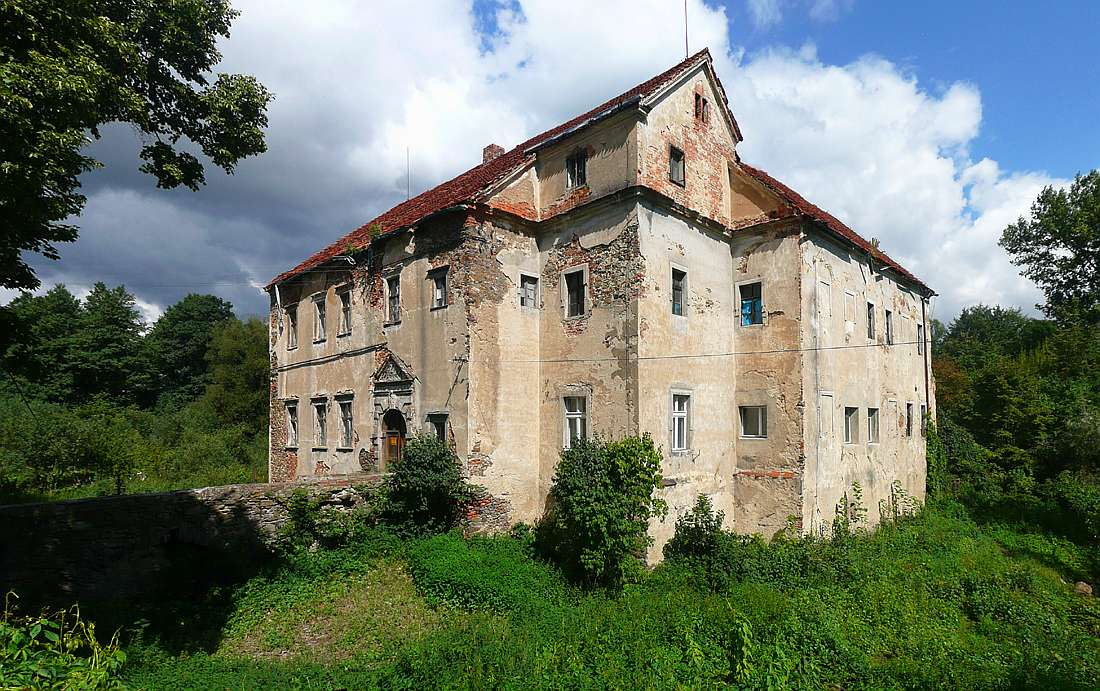
- Manor

- Location within Poland
- Coordinates: 50°46′56″N 16°43′25″E
- Country: Poland
- Voivodeship: Lower Silesian
- County: Dzierżoniów
- Gmina: Łagiewniki
- Population: 200

Stoszów [ˈstɔʂuf] is a village in the administrative district of Gmina Łagiewniki, within Dzierżoniów County, Lower Silesian Voivodeship, in south-western Poland.
