= Sieniawka, Dzierżoniów County =

Sieniawka
- Village
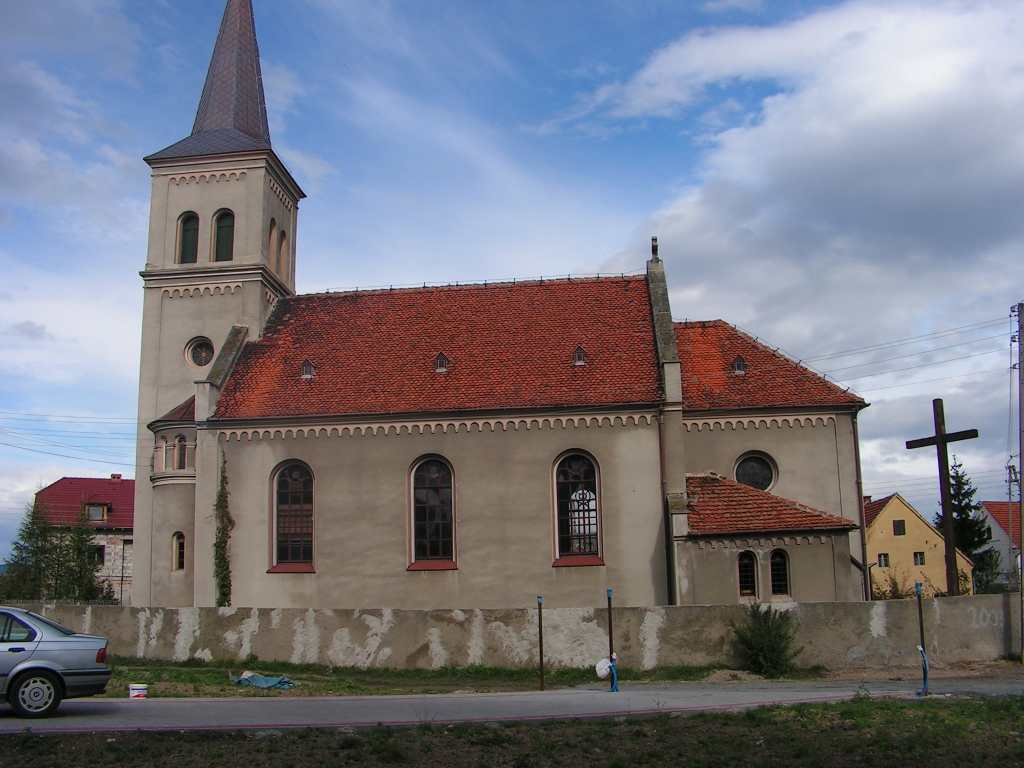
- Saint John the Baptist church in Sieniawka

- Location within Poland
- Coordinates: 50°46′44″N 16°46′31″E
- Country: Poland
- Voivodeship: Lower Silesian
- County: Dzierżoniów
- Gmina: Łagiewniki
- Population: 450
- Time zone: UTC+1 (CET)
  - Summer (DST): UTC+2 (CEST)
- Vehicle registration: DDZ

Sieniawka [ɕɛˈɲafka] is a village in the administrative district of Gmina Łagiewniki, within Dzierżoniów County, Lower Silesian Voivodeship, in south-western Poland.

The Sieniawka Lake is located close to the village. Its tank is about 300 meters long and has retention and leisure functions. The lake is used as a recreation center (sandbeach, swimming, beach volley, small catering and campsite).

== Sports ==
The local football club is Czarni Sieniawka. It competes in the lower leagues.

== Surroundings ==
- Gola Dzierżoniowska Castle
- Wojsławice Arboretum
- Medieval town of Niemcza
- Cistercian monastery at Henryków
