= Oleszna =

- Village
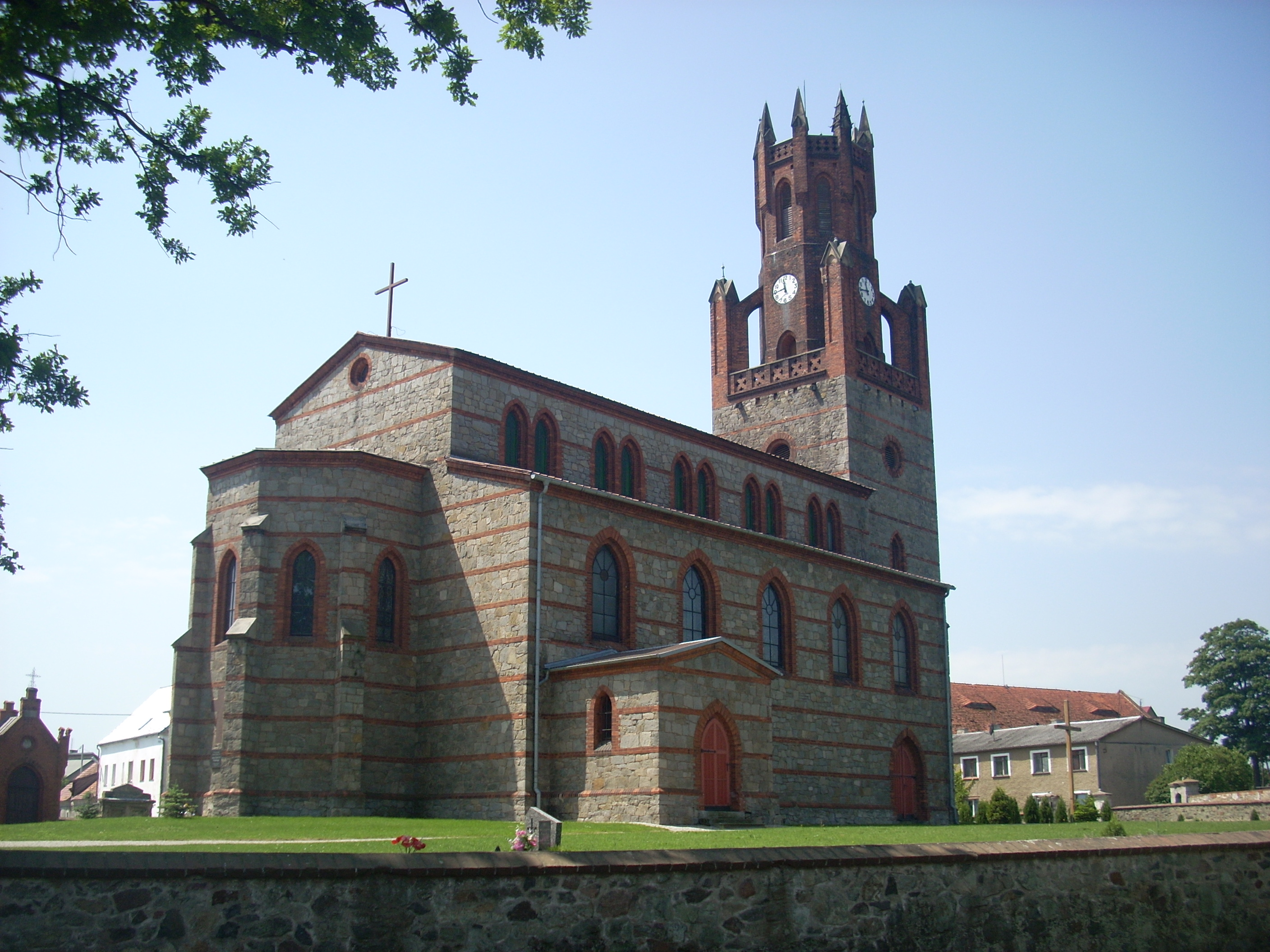
- Assumption of Virgin Mary Church

- Location within Poland
- Coordinates: 50°48′N 16°49′E
- Country: Poland
- Voivodeship: Lower Silesian
- County: Dzierżoniów
- Gmina: Łagiewniki

Population
  - Total: 900
- Time zone: UTC+1 (CET)
  - Summer (DST): UTC+2 (CEST)
- Vehicle registration: DDZ

Oleszna [ɔˈlɛʂna] is a village in the administrative district of Gmina Łagiewniki, within Dzierżoniów County, Lower Silesian Voivodeship, in south-western Poland.
