= Sokolniki, Dzierżoniów County =

Sokolniki
- Village
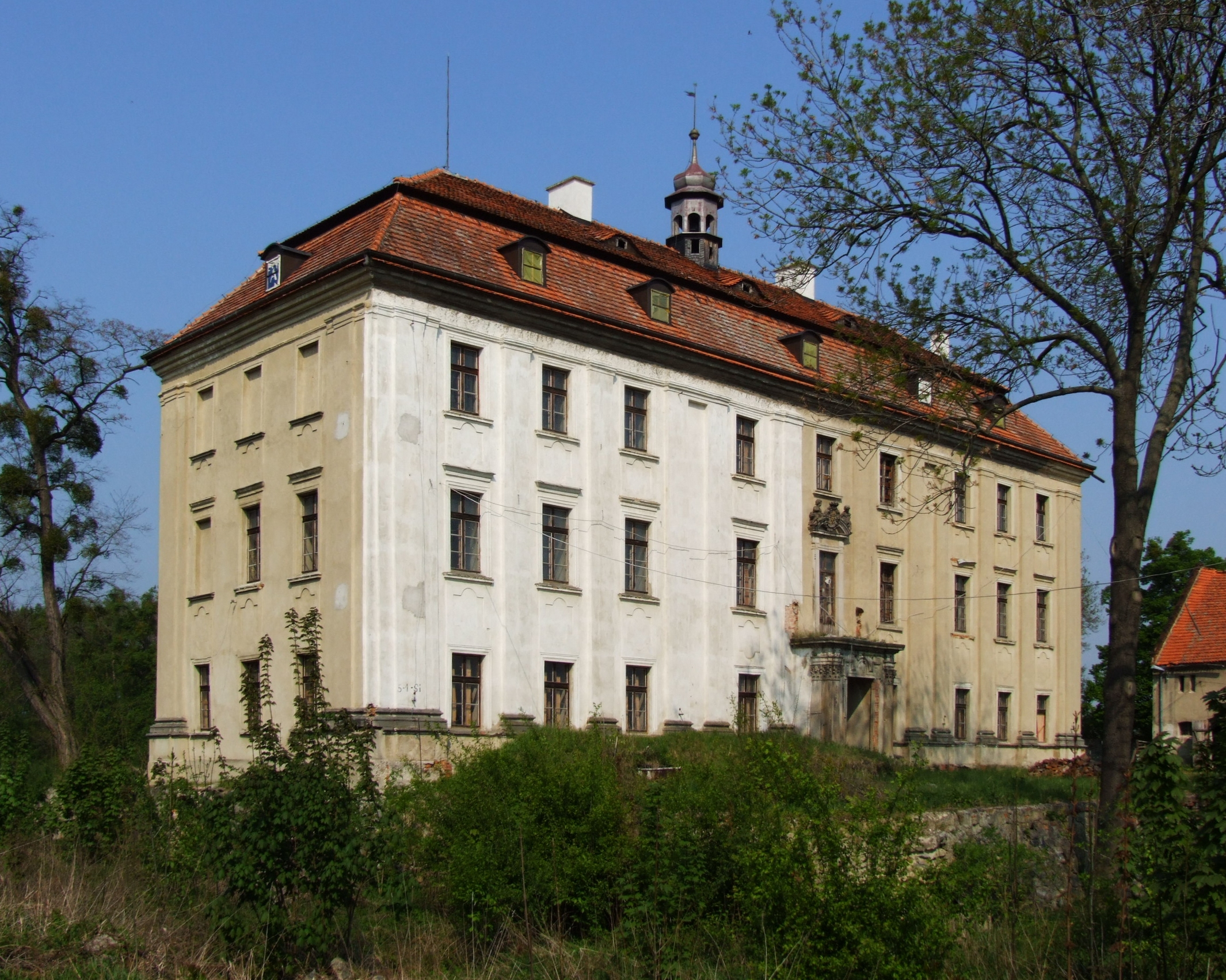
- Palace in Sokolniki

- Location within Poland
- Coordinates: 50°49′10″N 16°50′05″E
- Country: Poland
- Voivodeship: Lower Silesian
- County: Dzierżoniów
- Gmina: Łagiewniki
- Population: 350
- Time zone: UTC+1 (CET)
  - Summer (DST): UTC+2 (CEST)
- Vehicle registration: DDZ

Sokolniki [sɔkɔlˈɲikʲi] is a village in the administrative district of Gmina Łagiewniki, within Dzierżoniów County, Lower Silesian Voivodeship, in south-western Poland.

== Transport ==
The Polish National road 8 runs nearby, east of the village.
