= Sienice =

- Village
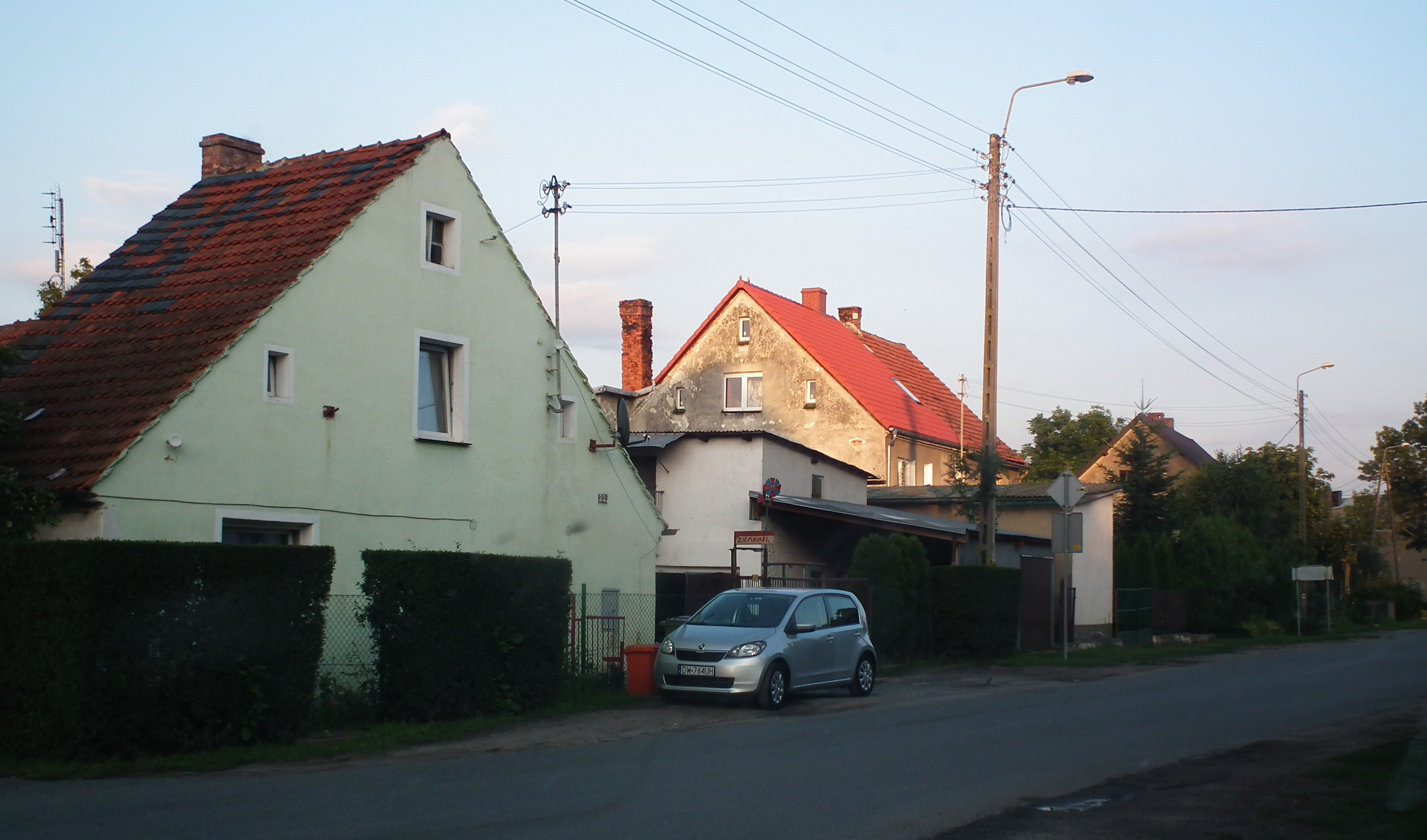

- Location within Poland
- Coordinates: 50°46′28″N 16°52′31″E
- Country: Poland
- Voivodeship: Lower Silesian
- County: Dzierżoniów
- Gmina: Łagiewniki
- Population: 360

Sienice [ɕɛˈnit͡sɛ] is a village in the administrative district of Gmina Łagiewniki, within Dzierżoniów County, Lower Silesian Voivodeship, in south-western Poland.
