= Gola Świdnicka =

- Village
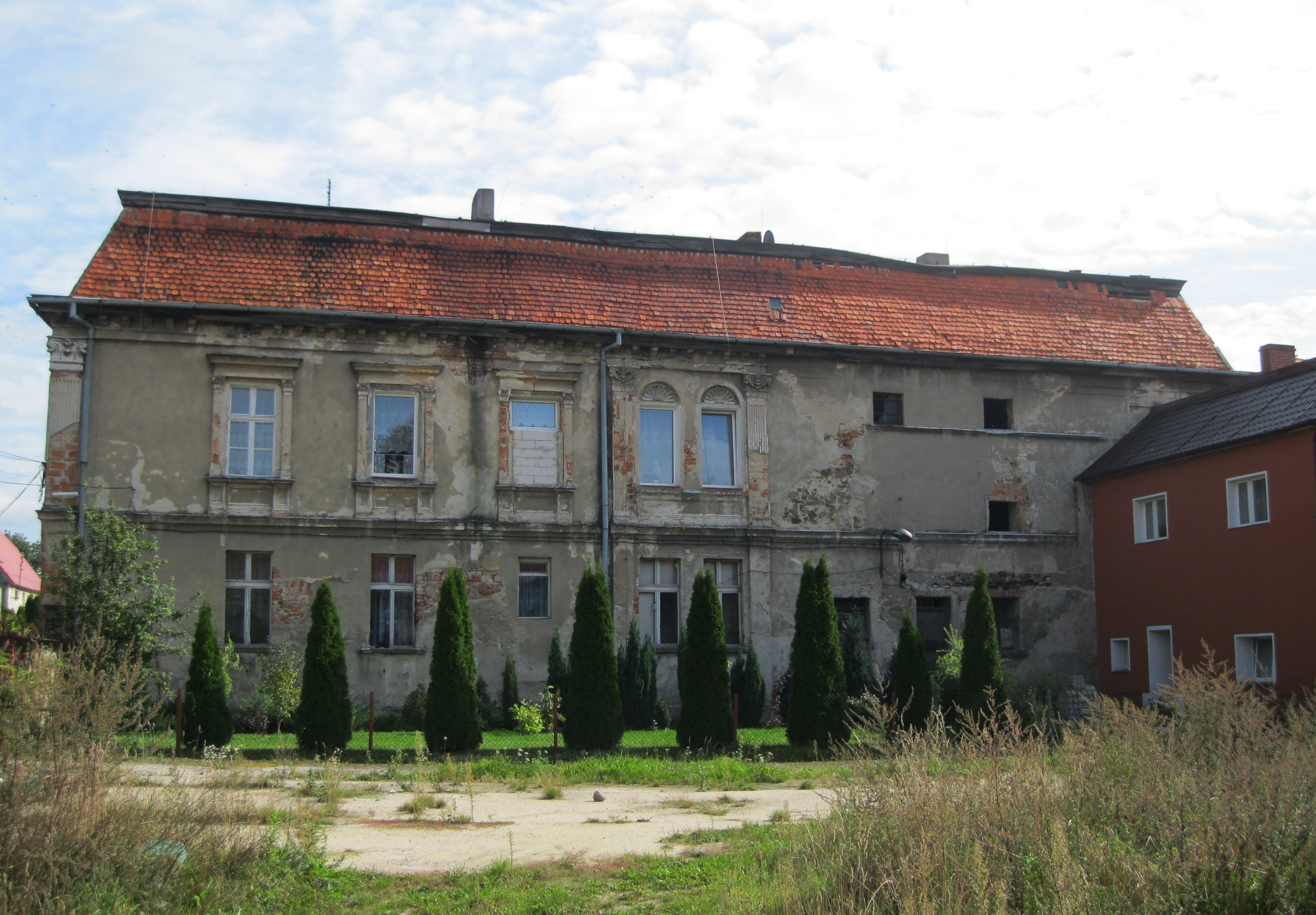
- Manor

- Location within Poland
- Coordinates: 50°55′08″N 16°36′28″E
- Country: Poland
- Voivodeship: Lower Silesian
- County: Świdnica
- Gmina: Marcinowice

Gola Świdnicka [ˈɡɔla ɕfidˈnit͡ska] is a village in the administrative district of Gmina Marcinowice, within Świdnica County, Lower Silesian Voivodeship, in south-western Poland.
