= Gruszów, Lower Silesian Voivodeship =

Gruszów
- Village
- Location within Poland
- Coordinates: 50°53′10″N 16°33′29″E
- Country: Poland
- Voivodeship: Lower Silesian
- County: Świdnica
- Gmina: Marcinowice

Gruszów [ˈɡruʂuf] is a village in the administrative district of Gmina Marcinowice, within Świdnica County, Lower Silesian Voivodeship, in south-western Poland.
