= Biała, Świdnica County =

Biała
- Village
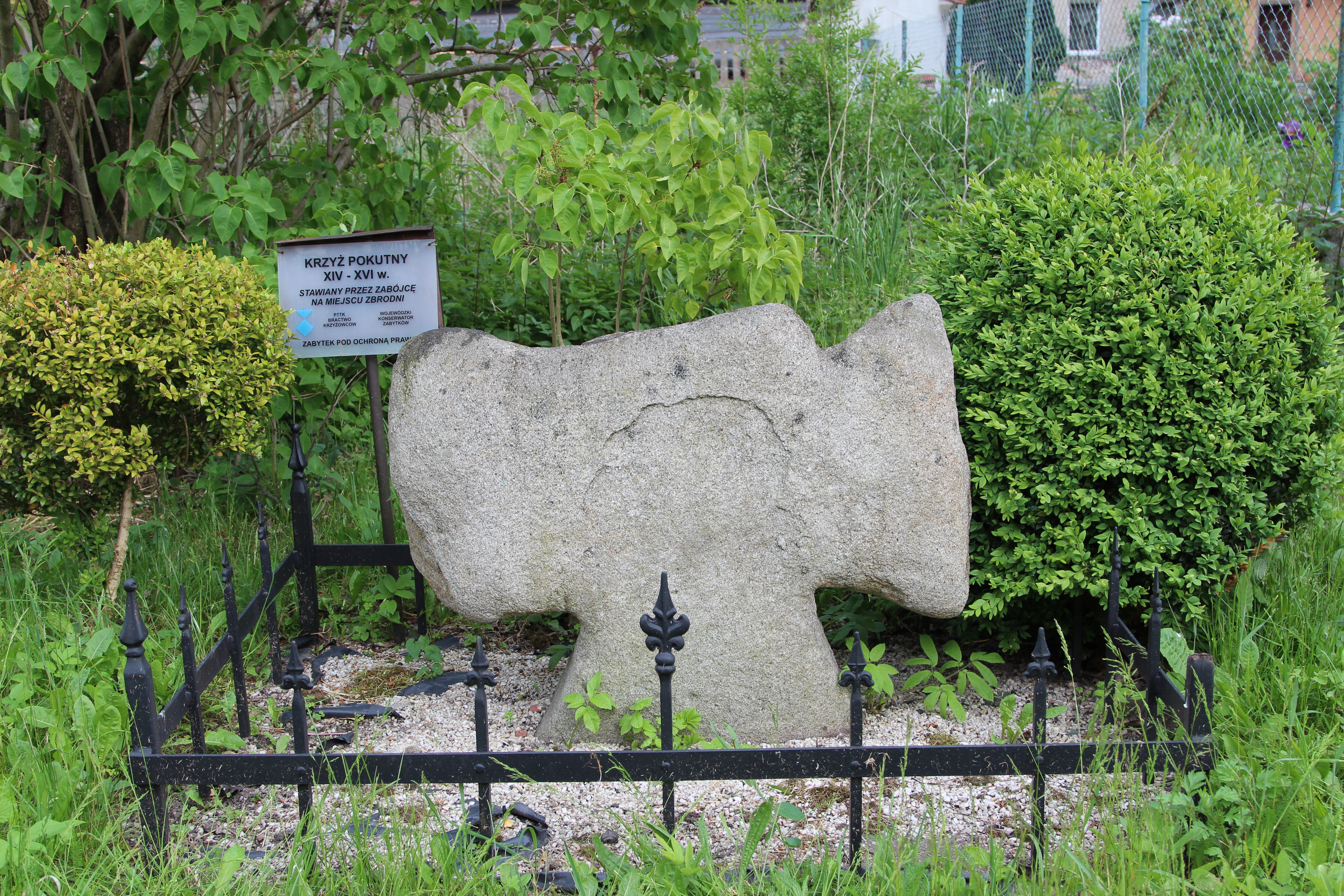
- Late medieval stone cross in Biała

- Location within Poland
- Coordinates: 50°53′04″N 16°39′48″E
- Country: Poland
- Voivodeship: Lower Silesian
- County: Świdnica
- Gmina: Marcinowice
- Time zone: UTC+1 (CET)
  - Summer (DST): UTC+2 (CEST)
- Vehicle registration: DSW

Biała [ˈbjawa] is a village in the administrative district of Gmina Marcinowice, within Świdnica County, Lower Silesian Voivodeship, in south-western Poland.

== Etymology ==
The name of the village is of Polish origin, and is derived from the word biały, which means "white".
