= Gmina Łagiewniki =

Gmina Łagiewniki Łagiewniki Commune
- Gmina
- Flag Coat of arms
- Interactive map of Gmina Łagiewniki
- Coordinates (Łagiewniki): 50°47′28″N 16°50′39″E
- Country: Poland
- Voivodeship: Lower Silesian
- County: Dzierżoniów
- Seat: Łagiewniki
- Sołectwos: Jaźwina, Łagiewniki, Ligota Wielka, Młynica, Oleszna, Przystronie, Radzików, Ratajno, Sieniawka, Sienice, Słupice, Sokolniki, Stoszów, Trzebnik

Area
  - Total: 124.42 km^{2} (48.04 sq mi)

Population (2019-06-30)
  - Total: 7,443
  - Density: 59.82/km^{2} (154.9/sq mi)
- Website: http://www.lagiewniki.pl

Gmina Łagiewniki is a rural gmina (administrative district) in Dzierżoniów County, Lower Silesian Voivodeship, in south-western Poland. Its seat is the village of Łagiewniki, which lies approximately 23 kilometres (14 mi) east of Dzierżoniów and 40 km (25 mi) south of the regional capital Wrocław.

The gmina covers an area of 124.42 square kilometres (48.04 sq mi), and as of 2019 its total population is 7,443.

== Neighbouring gminas ==
Gmina Łagiewniki is bordered by the gminas of Dzierżoniów, Jordanów Śląski, Kondratowice, Marcinowice, Niemcza and Sobótka.

== Villages ==
The gmina contains the villages of Domaszów, Janczowice, Jaźwina, Kuchary, Łagiewniki, Ligota Wielka, Młynica, Mniowice, Oleszna, Przystronie, Radzików, Ratajno, Sieniawka, Sienice, Słupice, Sokolniki, Stoszów, Trzebnik and Uliczno.
