= Słupice, Lower Silesian Voivodeship =

Słupice
- Village
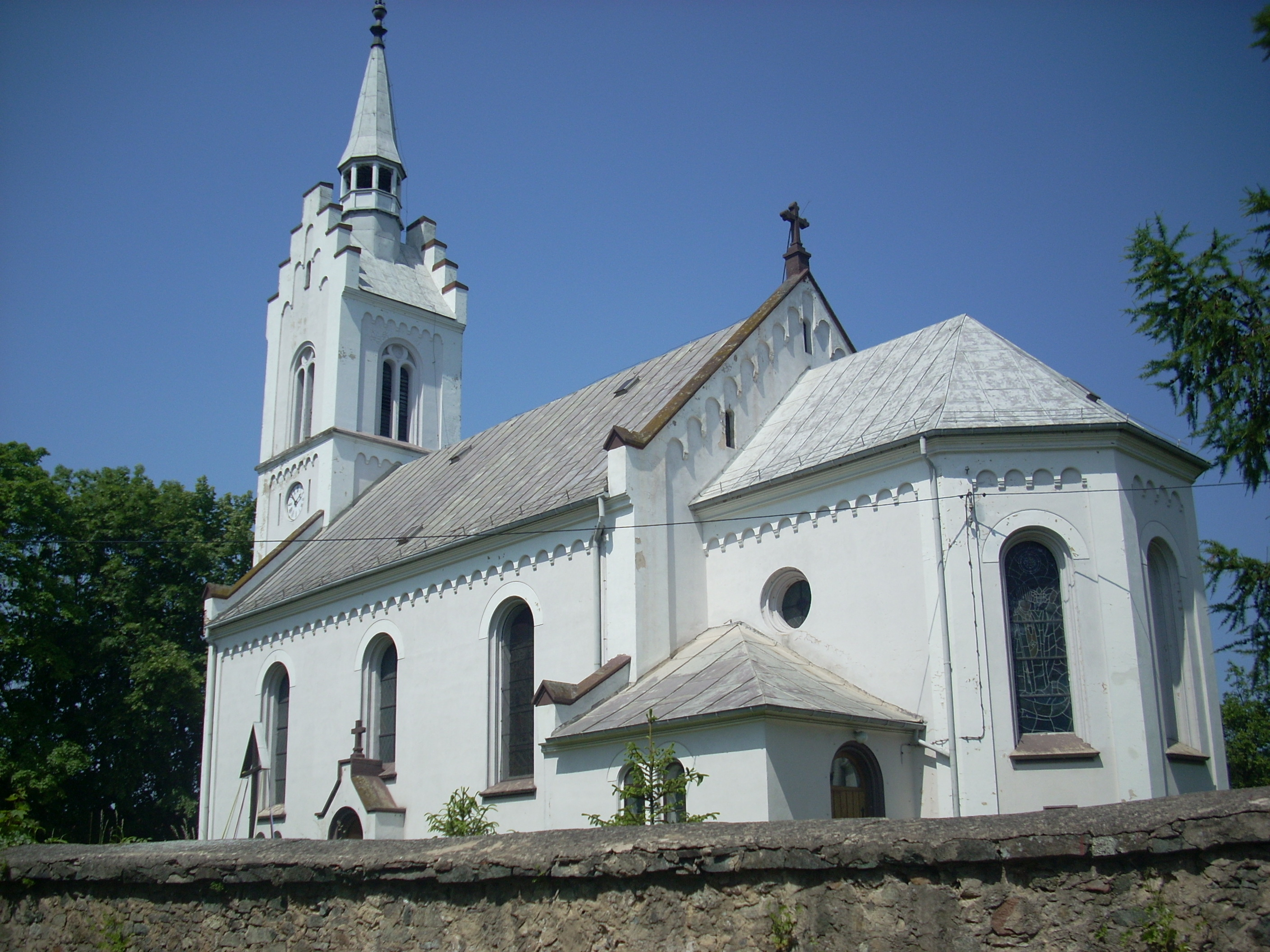
- Saint Michael Archangel church in Słupice

- Location within Poland
- Coordinates: 50°48′50″N 16°44′37″E
- Country: Poland
- Voivodeship: Lower Silesian
- County: Dzierżoniów
- Gmina: Łagiewniki

Population
  - Total: 450
- Time zone: UTC+1 (CET)
  - Summer (DST): UTC+2 (CEST)
- Vehicle registration: DDZ

Słupice [swuˈpit͡sɛ] is a village in the administrative district of Gmina Łagiewniki, within Dzierżoniów County, Lower Silesian Voivodeship, in south-western Poland.
