= Krasków, Lower Silesian Voivodeship =

Krasków
- Village
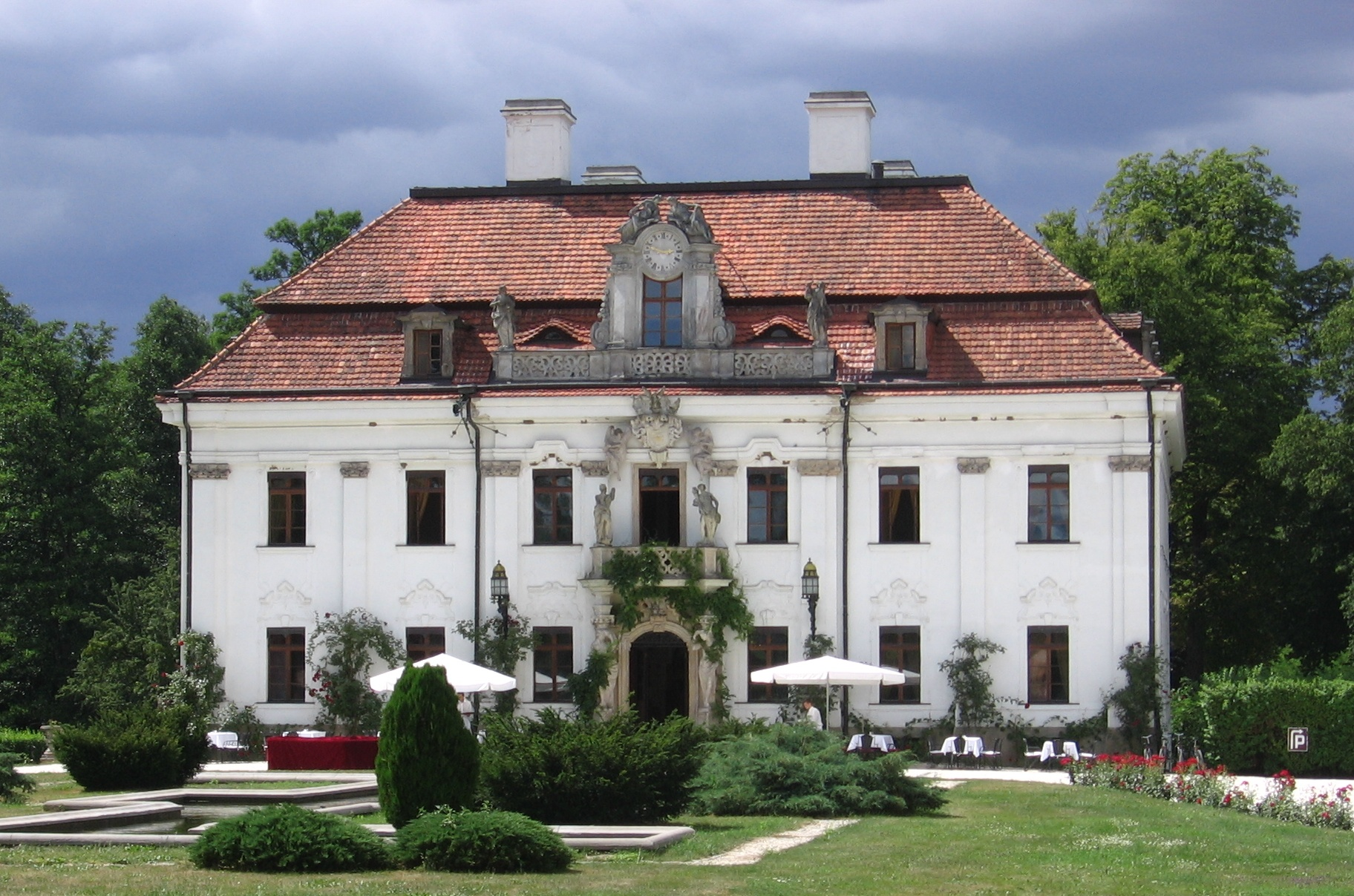
- Krasków Palace

- Location within Poland
- Coordinates: 50°54′48″N 16°35′12″E
- Country: Poland
- Voivodeship: Lower Silesian
- County: Świdnica
- Gmina: Marcinowice
- Time zone: UTC+1 (CET)
  - Summer (DST): UTC+2 (CEST)
- Vehicle registration: DSW

Krasków [ˈkraskuf] is a village in the administrative district of Gmina Marcinowice, within Świdnica County, Lower Silesian Voivodeship, in south-western Poland.

== Etymology ==
The name of the village is of Polish origin and comes from the word kraska, which means "roller".

== Sights ==
Krasków is the site of a Baroque palace, built by the Bohemian Zedlitz-Leipe noble family in 1746, allegedly according to plans by Joseph Emanuel Fischer von Erlach. Situated in a park laid out by Peter Joseph Lenné in 1848 it today serves as a hotel.
