= Ligota Wielka, Dzierżoniów County =

Ligota Wielka
- Village
- Location within Poland
- Coordinates: 50°45′31″N 16°47′16″E
- Country: Poland
- Voivodeship: Lower Silesian
- County: Dzierżoniów
- Gmina: Łagiewniki
- Population: 350

Ligota Wielka [liˈɡɔta ˈvjɛlka] is a village in the administrative district of Gmina Łagiewniki, in Dzierżoniów County, Lower Silesian Voivodeship, in south-western Poland.
