= Walim, Lower Silesian Voivodeship =

Walim
- Village
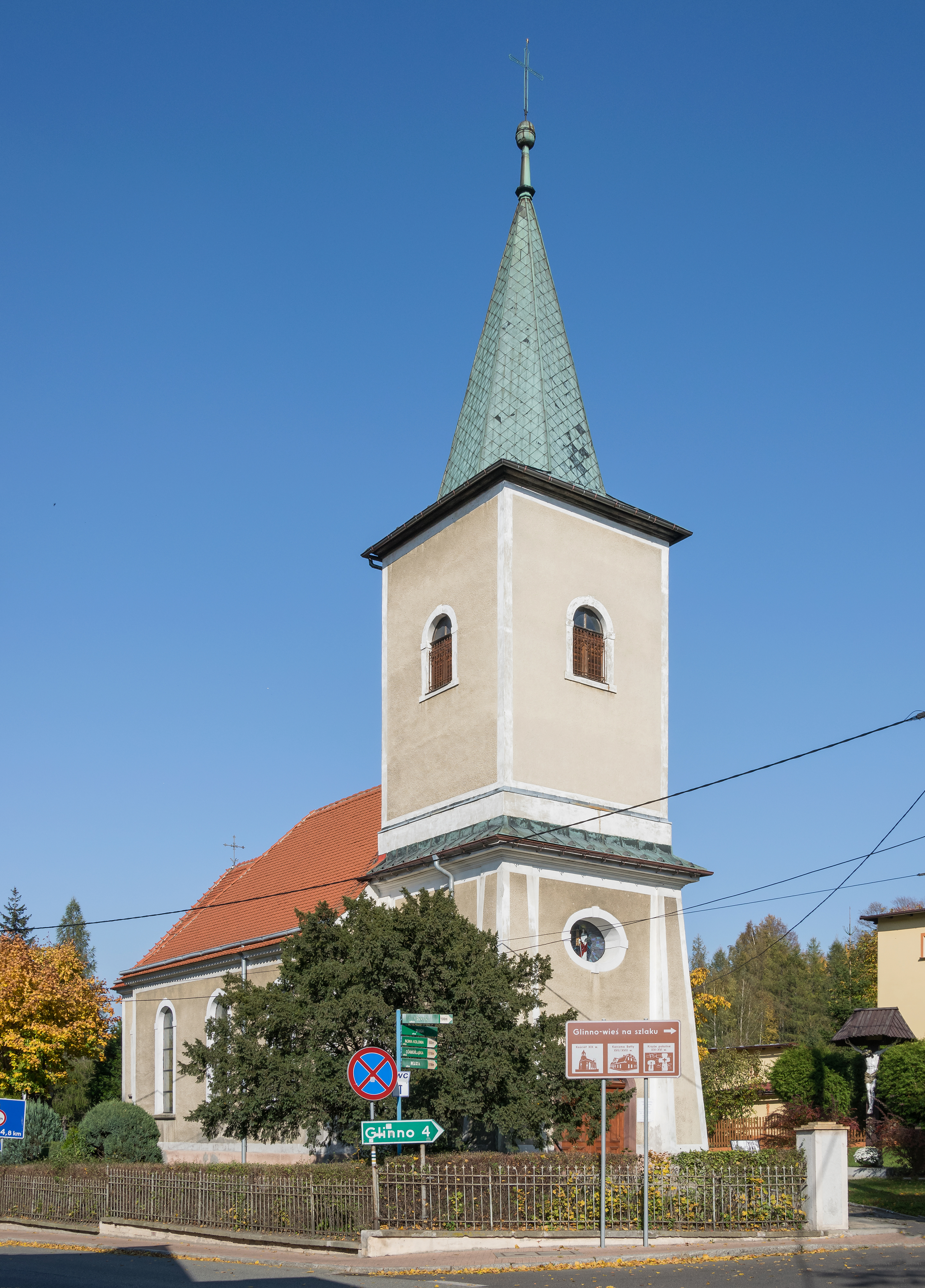
- Saint Barbara Church

- Coat of arms

- Location within Poland
- Coordinates: 50°41′53″N 16°26′42″E
- Country: Poland
- Voivodeship: Lower Silesian
- County: Wałbrzych
- Gmina: Walim
- Population: 2,340
- Time zone: UTC+1 (CET)
  - Summer (DST): UTC+2 (CEST)
- Postal code: 58-320
- Area code: (+48) 74
- Vehicle registration: DBA
- Website: www.walim.pl

Walim [ˈvalim] is a village in Wałbrzych County, Lower Silesian Voivodeship, in south-western Poland. It is the seat of the administrative district (gmina) called Gmina Walim. The town is notable for 300-year-old timber framed houses.

== Geography ==
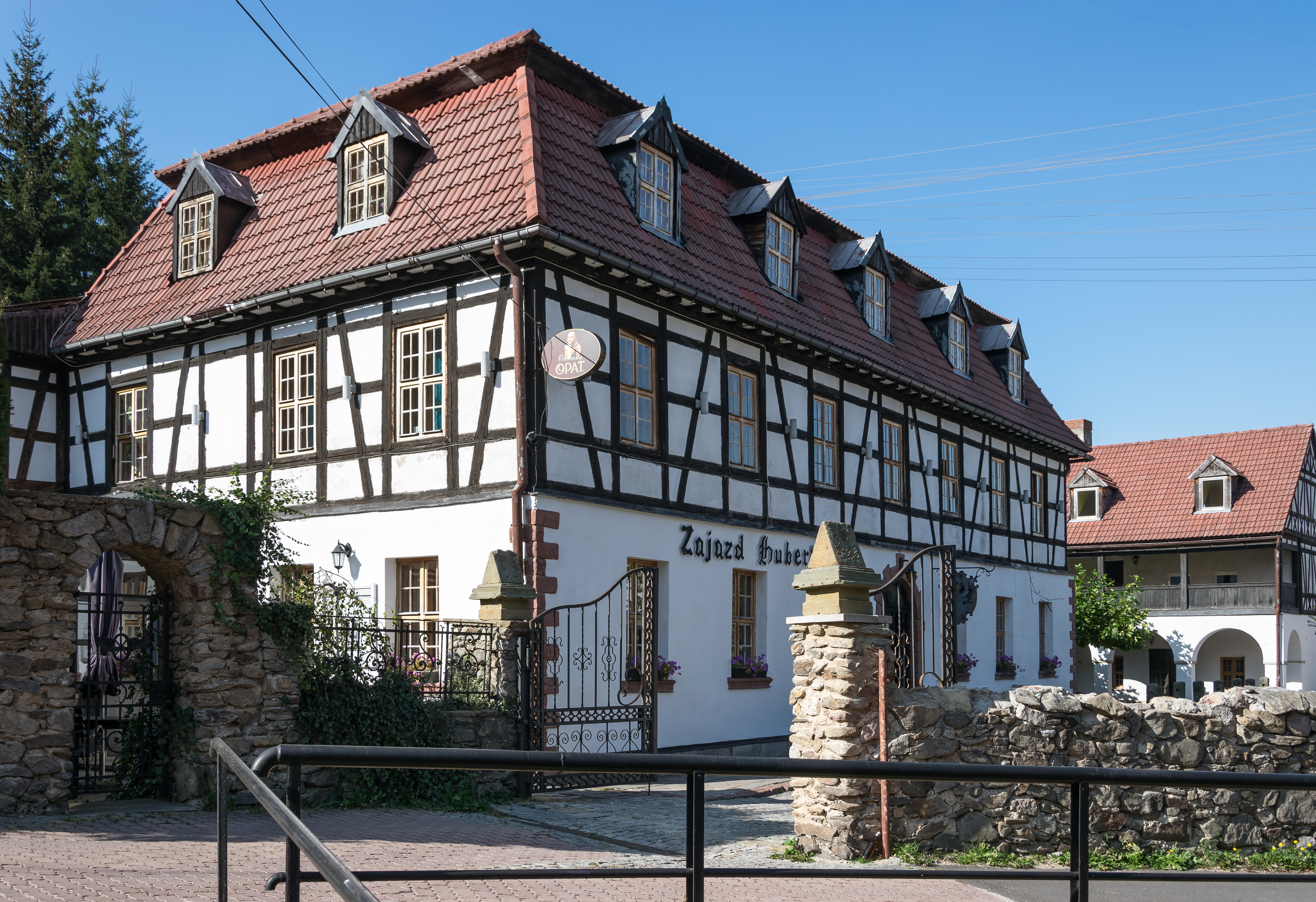
Zajazd Huberta - Hubert's Inn

Walim is situated in the north-west of the Owl Mountains, along the Voivodeship Road 383, which leads from Jugowice over the Przełęcz Walimska pass to Dzierżoniów. Neighboring towns are Kokrza to the north, Michałkowa, Glinno and Toszowice to the northeast, Modlęcin and Domachów to the east, Siedlików and Rzeczka to the southeast, Grządki and Głuszyca to the southwest, Jedlinka Górna to the west and Dolki and Sędzimierz to the northwest. To the southeast lies the 1,014 m-tall (3,327 ft) mountain Wielka Sowa, the highest peak of the Owl Mountains.

== Demographics ==
According to the Polish National Census, (March 2011) 2,340 inhabitants were counted in total.

== History ==
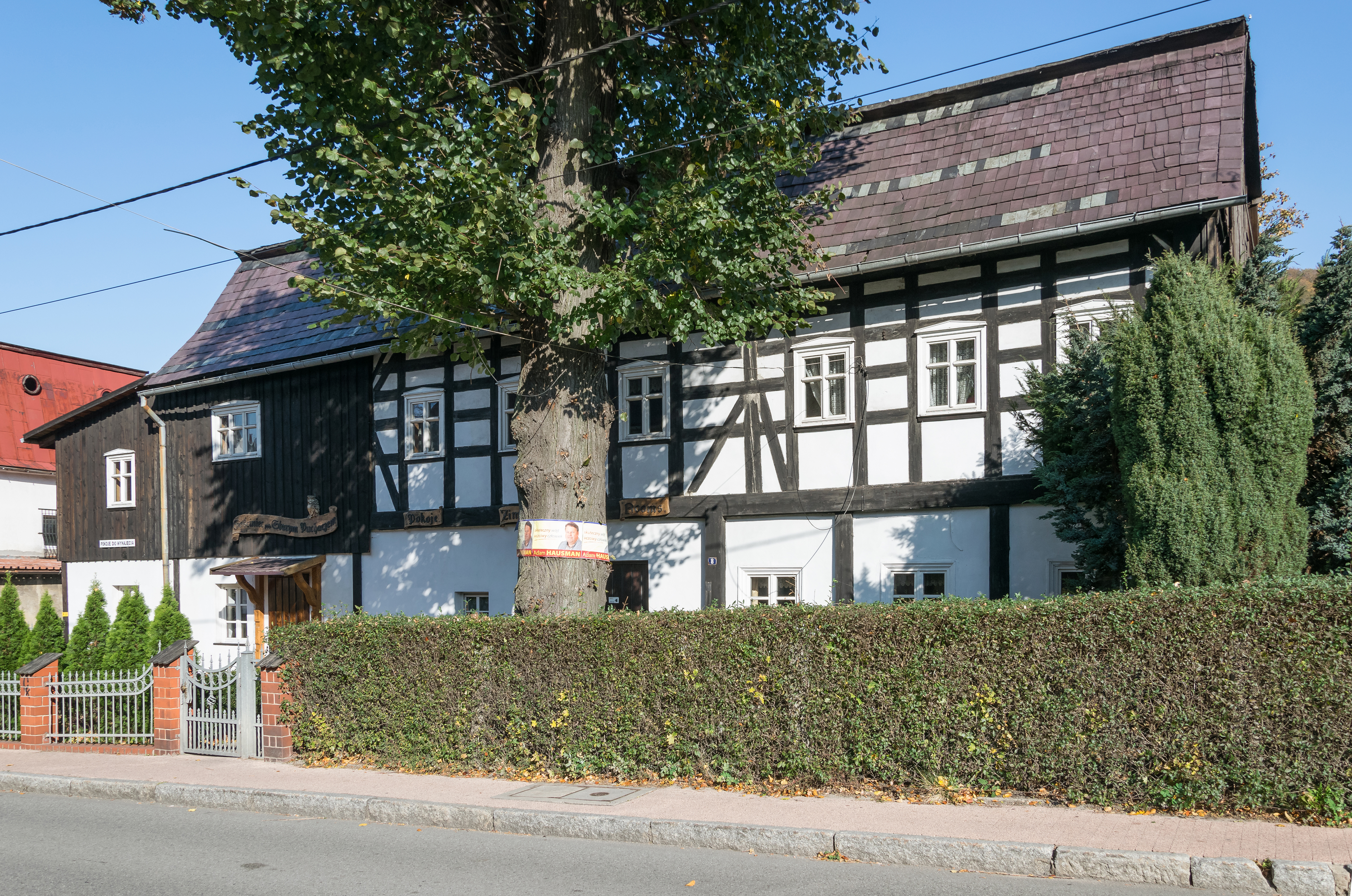
A timber-framed house from 1704

Walim was probably settled around 1220 and first mentioned in 1305 as Waltheri villa (Waltersdorf), when part of Piast-ruled Poland. During the Hussite Wars, Waltersdorf was destroyed in 1425 and rebuilt from 1530 to 1548. Around the year 1600, the name Waltersdorf was changed to Wüste Waltersdorf. This was due to Waltersdorf, during the Thirty Years' War, many of its citizens were affected by a drought in the village. Among the frequent changing nobility was that of Haugwitz, von Beyer and Peterswaldau. In the middle of the 16th century, it belonged to the Melchior von Seydlitz, a new settlement for Protestants from Bohemia, Moravia and the County of Kladsko. After the Thirty Years' War, the Protestant Church was handed over to Catholics in 1654. In the same year, Wüste Waltersdorf came under the family von Zedlitz, whose most famous representative was the Prussian Minister of State, Karl Abraham von Zedlitz. He had visited several times to Wüste Waltersdorf by King Frederick II. In the 18th century, Wüste Waltersdorf developed into a center of the textile industry. In 1737 "Zedlitzhaide" was established.

After the First Silesian War in 1742, Wüste Waltersdorf together with most of Silesia, fell to Prussia in 1742. In the same year, an evangelical prayer house and an evangelical school were built. Since 1765, weekly linen markets have taken place. In 1777 the "Eckardtsberg Colony" and in 1788 the "Friedrichsberg Colony" were founded. In 1779 a linen shop was built, where the linen markets were held until 1830. In 1808, the von Zedlitz family sold Wüste Waltersdorf.

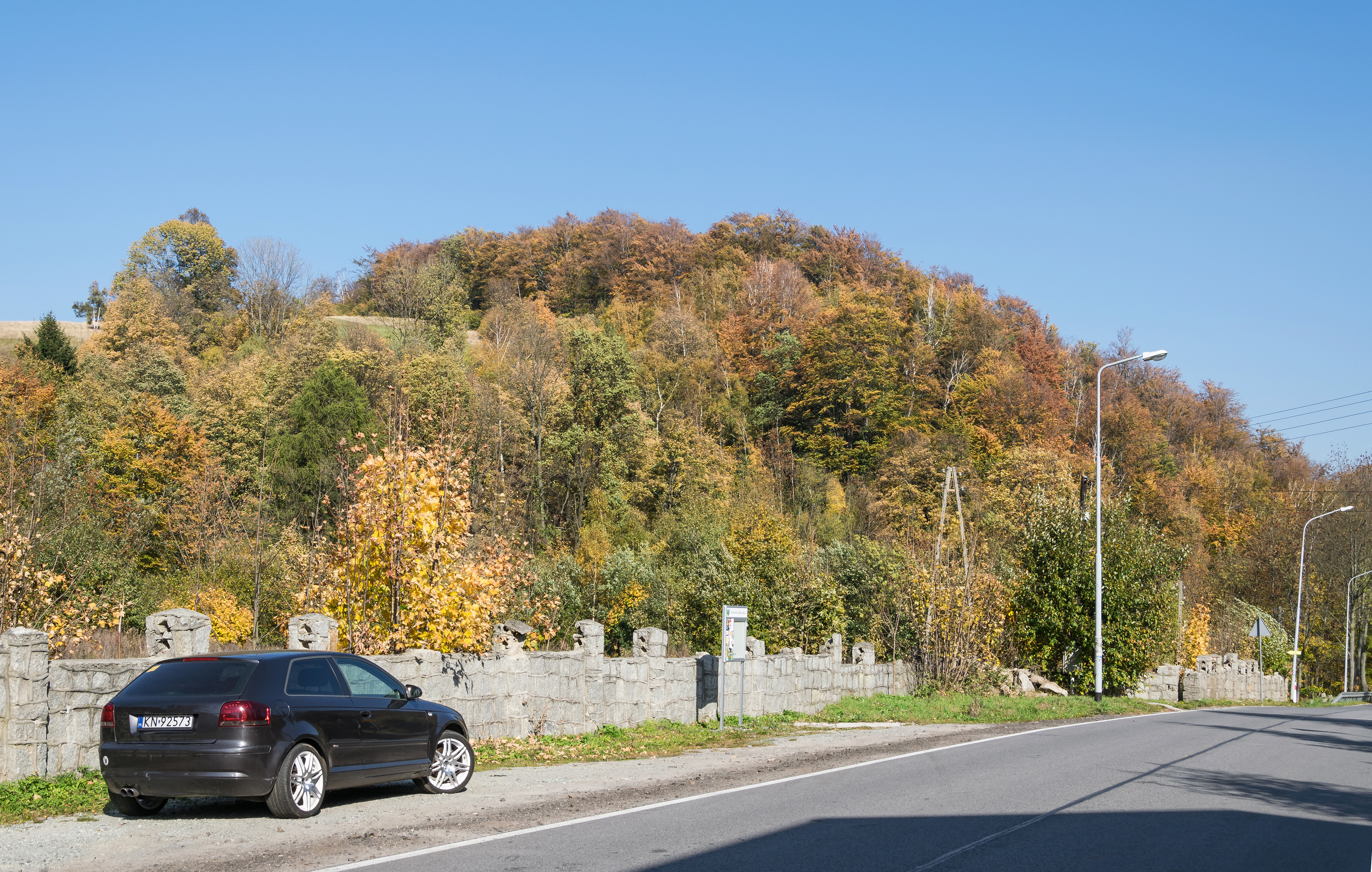
Owl Mountains

After the reorganization from Prussia, Wüste Waltersdorf was part of the Province of Silesia in 1815, and in 1816 was incorporated into the Waldenburg District, in which it remained until 1945. The textile factory Meyer-Kauffmann was established in 1843, was moved to Blumenau in 1854. In 1871 the village became part of the German Empire. Since 1874, the rural community of Wüstewaltersdorf has been the seat of the administrative district of the same name, including the rural villages of Rzeczka, Grządki, Silesian Falkenberg and Siedlików. In 1892, the newspaper "Der Bote aus dem Eulengebirge" was founded. In 1903, 1,100 employees were employed in the textile factories Websky, Hartmann and Wiesen AG.

In 1914, Wüstewaltersdorf was connected to the village of Jugowice's electric railway line. It was one of the first electrified railway lines in modern-day Poland. The line was closed in 1959 and then demolished.

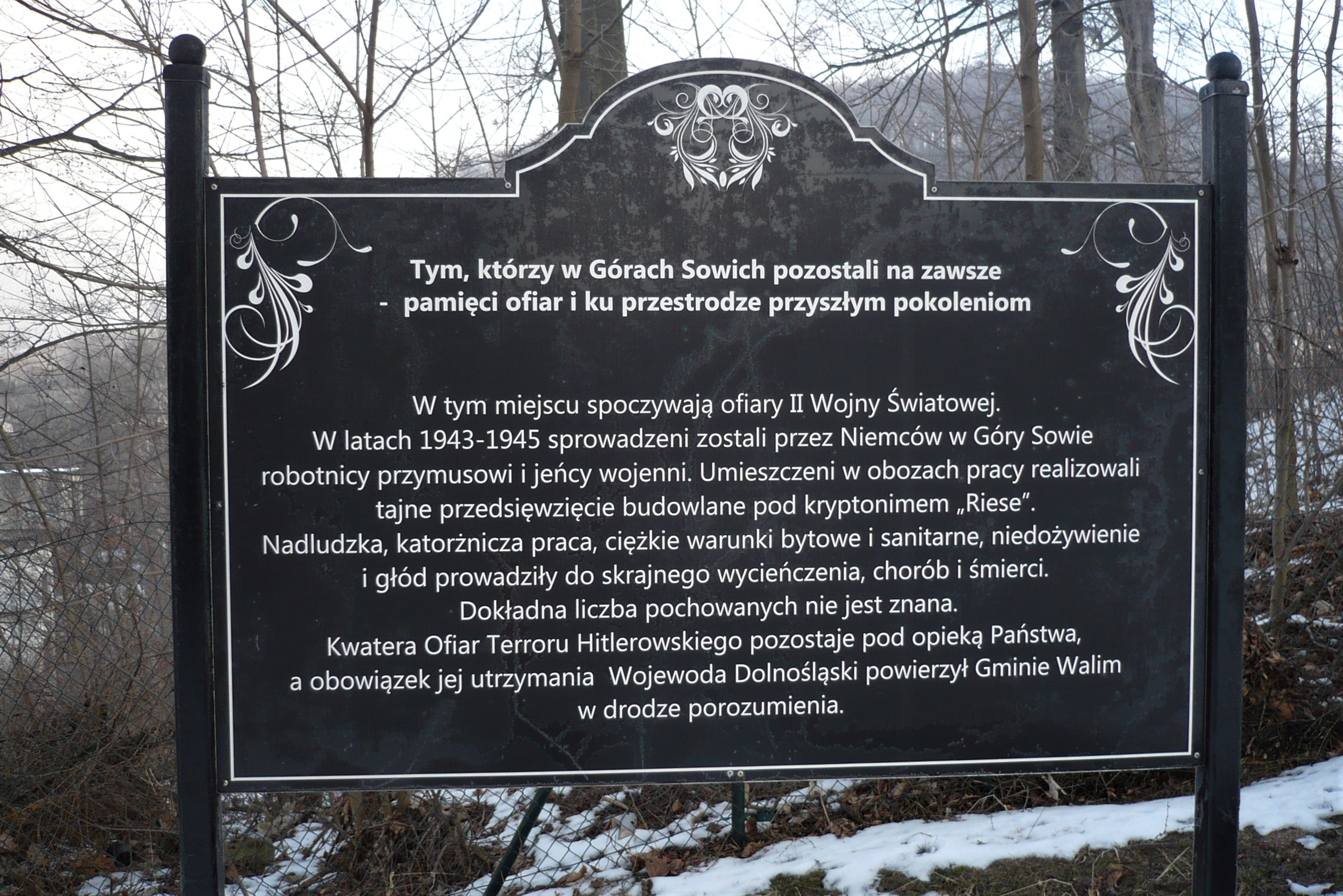
Plaque at the cemetery of the victims of the local German forced labour camp

During World War II, Wüstewaltersdorf was one part of Project Riese, which was used by Organisation Todt. In November 1943, there was a forced labour camp in Wüstewaltersdorf for about 1,500 mostly Jewish prisoners in a decommissioned weaving mill (Websky, Hartmann, and Wiesen AG). There were also Polish, Italian, Russian and Ukrainian prisoners in the camp. In 1944, the camp was cleared for a typhus epidemic and converted to a hospital with 600 beds for Organisation Todt. Since 1944 it was a subcamp of the Gross-Rosen concentration camp.

After Germany's defeat in World War II, Walim became again part of Poland.

In 1957, Walim was elevated to a city-like settlement. Between 1975 and 1998 it belonged to the Wałbrzych Voivodship.

== Landmarks ==
- The parish church of St. Barbara was erected as an evangelical church in 1548 and used as a Catholic church in 1654. The main architectural altar dates from the 1780s. The figure of the mother god with child in the choir is from the end of the 18th century, the risen Christ from around 1860.
- Numerous town houses from the 18th century
- Family tomb of the family von Zedlitz
- The tunnel system Project Riese, south of the city, there is an entrance to an underground gallery construction and hall system, which was probably created from 1943 to 1945 as a leader's headquarters.
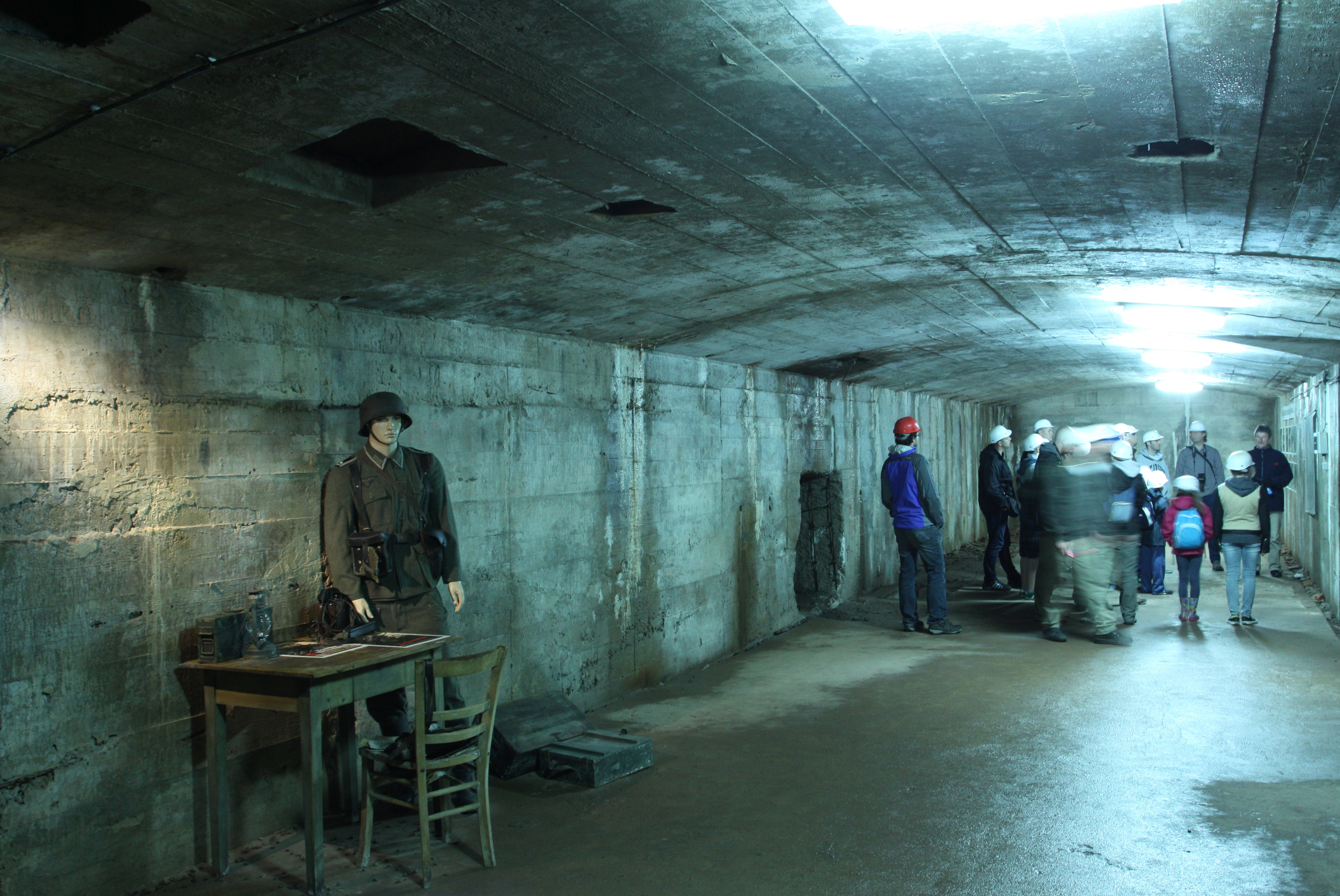
- A section of one of the tunnels contained in Projekt Riese
  In 1742 an evangelical prayer house was built, which was rebuilt in the Baroque style in 1751. After its destruction 1945, it was rebuilt.

== Notable people ==
- Joseph Ernst Seppelt (1813–1868), Australian merchant, founder of Seppeltsfield, South Australia and the Seppelt winery
- Ernst Rode (1894–1955), German major general
- Konrad Weiss (1907–1979), German theologian
- Filip Rozbicki (1919–2011), Polish photographer and soldier

== In popular culture ==
In 2014, Walim is shown in the documentary short film Depositary produced by the television network TVN. The documentary depicts the story of Łukasz Kazek, a resident of Walim, who in the Owl Mountains finds hidden deposits by German residents displaced as a result of the provisions of the Potsdam Conference from the areas which passed from Nazi Germany to Poland after World War II.
