= List of subcamps of Gross-Rosen =

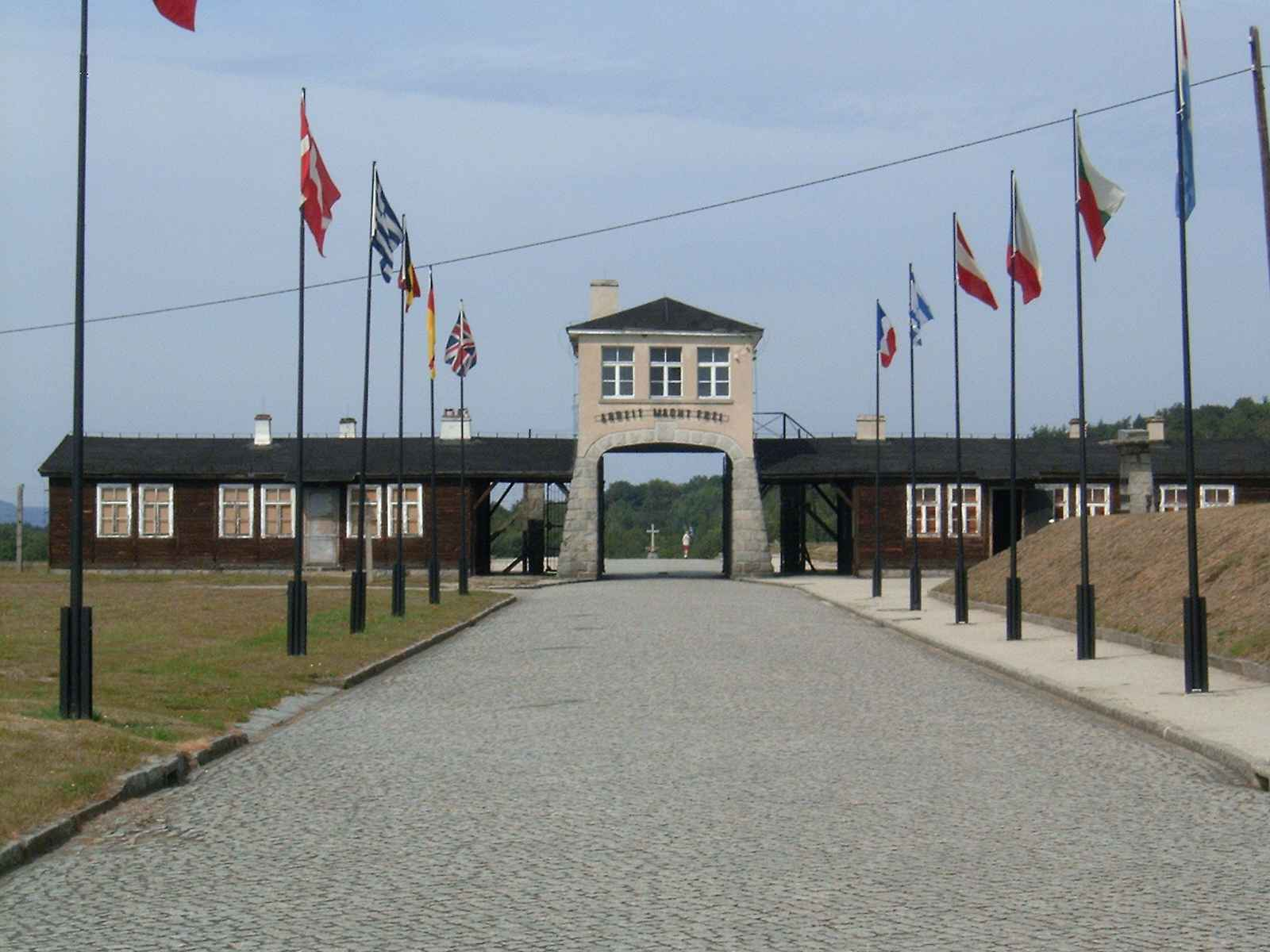
Gross-Rosen main camp

Below is the list of subcamps of Gross-Rosen concentration camp, a complex of Nazi concentration camps built and operated by Nazi Germany during World War II. The camps are arranged alphabetically by their Nazi German designation. For the list of present-day locations in alphabetical order, please use table-sort buttons.

The majority of prisoners came from occupied Poland (up to 90% in some subcamps) both Christian and Jewish (usually separated). Most, were put to work as slave labour in textile, armament, mining and defence construction industries. Other nationalities included Czechs, Slovaks, Roma, Belgians, Frenchmen, Russians, Yugoslavs, Hungarians and even ethnically German and Italian inmates. Thousands were brought in from Auschwitz after the selection to work for a network of German companies which ballooned in size during this period; with dozens of subcontractors. The inmates of Dyhernfurth for example, were utilized by almost thirty Nazi German startups.

== List of subcamps ==
| Subcamp name | Present-day location | Purpose & prisoners |
|---|---|---|
| Aslau | Osła | Concordia-Werk Bunzlau, Focke-Wulf (min. 616) |
| Bad Charlottenbrunn | Jedlina-Zdrój | Organisation Todt |
| Bad Salzbrunn | Szczawno-Zdrój | construction work (men) |
| Bad Warmbrunn | Cieplice Śląskie-Zdrój | Maschinen Fabrik Dorries-Füllner (800) |
| Bernsdorf | Bernartice | Part of the 'Trautenau Ring' of labor camps under the command Fritz Ritterbusch and Else Hawlik. Immediate Supervisor, Kommandoführerin Maria Mühl. |
| Birnbäumel | Gruszeczka | Unternehmen Barthold (1,000 women) |
| Bolkenhain | Bolków | Vereinigte Deutsche Metallwerke (min. 800) |
| Breslau I & II | Wrocław | Famo-Werke, Linke-Hofmann-Werke (1,200 men) |
| Brünnlitz | Brněnec | Armaments factory run by Oskar Schindler (1,200) |
| Buchwald-Hohenwiese | Bukowiec | maintenance |
| Bunzlau I & II | Boleslawiec | I: Holzindustrie Hubert Land (1,200); II: Concordia Spinerei und Weberei Company |
| Christianstadt | Krzystkowice (pl), Nowogród | Dynamit AG Nobel |
| Dörnhau | Kolce | Project Riese; Organisation Todt |
| Dyhernfurth | Brzeg Dolny | Anorgana (450), Luranil, subcontractors (3,000) |
| Erlenbusch | Olszyniec | Project Riese; Stollen Wolfsberg und Hausdorf |
| Falkenberg | Sowina (pl) near Sokolec | Project Riese; Stollen Falkenberg (1,500); (Sokolec – German: Falkenberg); (Sowina – German: Eule) |
| Faulbrück | Mościsko | |
| Freiburg in Schlesien | Świebodzice | AEG Allgemeine Elektrcitäts-Geselschaft |
| Friedland | Mieroszów | Vereinigte Deutsche Metallwerke Hamburg |
| Fünfteichen | Miłoszyce | Friedrich Krupp Berthawerk (6,000) |
| Fürstenstein | Książ, Wałbrzych | Project Riese; mining |
| Gabersdorf | Trutnov, Hradec | Hasse, Etrich, Vereinigte Textilwerke K.Z. Barthel; part of the 'Trautenau Ring' of labor camps under the command Fritz Ritterbusch and Else Hawlik. Immediate Supervisor, Kommandoführerin Charlotte Ressel. |
| Gassen | Jasień | |
| Gebhardsdorf | Giebułtów | |
| Gellenau | Jeleniów | |
| Görlitz | Zgorzelec | |
| Grünberg | Zielona Góra | (1,300 Jewish women) Lagerführerin Anna Fiebig |
| Gräben | Near Strzegom, Świdnica County, Lower Silesian Voivodeship | Part of the 'Trautenau Ring' of labor camps under the command Fritz Ritterbusch and Else Hawlik. Immediate Supervisor, Kommandoführerin Katharina Reimann. |
| Graffenort | Gorzanów | |
| Gräflich Röhsdorf | Skarbowa (Wrocław) | Siege of Breslau; Kommandoführerin Gertrud Sauer |
| Gruschwitz | Kruszwica | |
| Grulich | Králíky | |
| Guben | Gubin | |
| Halbau | Ilowa | |
| Halbstadt | Gross Rosen | |
| Halbstadt | Meziměstí, | |
| Hartmannsdorf | Miłoszów | |
| Hausdorf | Jugowice | |
| Hirschberg | Jelenia Góra | |
| Hochweiler | Wierzchowice | Unternehmen Barthold (1,000 Jewish women); (Alte Ziegelei – "old brick factory") |
| Hundsfeld (Breslau) | Psie Pole | Kommandoführerin Emilie (Emma) Kowa |
| Kaltenbrunn | Studzienno | |
| Kaltwasser | Zimna Woda (pl), Głuszyca | Project Riese |
| Kamenz | Kamenz, Saxony | |
| Kittlitztreben | Trzebień | |
| Klein Radisch | Klein-Radisch, Radšowk (de) | |
| Königszelt | Jaworzyna Śląska | |
| Kratzau I and II | Chrastava | |
| Kretschamberg | Karczmarka, Trzebień | |
| Kurzbach I | Bukołowo near Milicz | |
| Kurzbach-Gruenthal | Gruenthal, see: Bukołowo (pl) | |
| Langenbielau | Bielawa, Dzierżoniów | Siling, Hansen, Telefunken, Krupp (2,000); served as a training location for SS-Aufseherinnen in 1944–1945. |
| Landeshut | Kamienna Góra | |
| Lärche | Góra Soboń (pl), Głuszyca | Project Riese; (Soboń (góra) – German: Ramenberg) |
| Laskowitz | Jelcz-Laskowice | |
| Lehmwasser | Glinica, Jedlina-Zdrój | |
| Liebau | Lubawka | |
| Lissa | Wrocław | |
| Ludwigsdorf | Ludwikowice Klodzkie | Part of the Trautenau Ring' of labor camps under the command Fritz Ritterbusch and Else Hawlik. |
| Märzdorf | Marciszów | Kommandoführerin Erna Rinke |
| Markstädt | Jelcz-Laskowice | |
| Mährisch-Weisswasser | Bílá Voda | Telefunken (200 women) |
| Märzbachtal | Marcowy potok, Głuszyca | Project Riese |
| Mittelsteine | Ścinawka Średnia | |
| Namslau | Namysłów | |
| Neiße | Nysa, Poland | |
| Neuhammer | Świętoszów | |
| Neusalz/Oder | Nowa Sól | |
| Niesky | Niesky, Lusatia | |
| Nimptsch | Niemcza | |
| Ober Altstadt | Staré Město | Part of the 'Trautenau Ring' of labor camps under the command Fritz Ritterbusch and Else Hawlik. Immediate Supervisor, Kommandoführerin Irmgard Hoffmann. |
| Ober Hohenelbe | Vrchlabí | Part of the 'Trautenau Ring' of labor camps under the command Fritz Ritterbusch and Else Hawlik. |
| Oberwüstegiersdorf | Głuszyca Górna | Project Riese |
| Parschnitz | Poříčí | Außenlager ("subcamp") and offices of the 'Trautenau Ring' of labor camps under the command Fritz Ritterbusch and Else Hawlik. Immediate Supervisor was SS-Kommandoführerin Isolde Reznick. |
| Parschnitz | Poříčí | Zwangsarbeitslager für Juden ("forced labor camp for Jews") |
| Peterswaldau | Pieszyce | Lagerführerin Else Hain |
| Prausnitz | Prusice | |
| Reichenau | Rychnov u Jablonce nad Nisou | |
| Reichenbach, or Langenbielau II | Dzierżoniów | |
| Rauscha | Ruszów | |
| Sackisch | Zakrze | |
| Sankt/St. Georegnthal | Jiřetín pod Jedlovou | |
| Säuferwasser | Góra Osówka (pl), Głuszyca | Project Riese |
| Schatzlar | Žacléř | Part of the 'Trautenau Ring' of labor camps under the command Fritz Ritterbusch and Else Hawlik. Immediate Supervisor, Kommandoführerin Elisabeth Bischoff and Marchova. |
| Schertendorf | Przylep | |
| Schmiedeberg | Kowary | |
| Schotterwerk | Głuszyca Górna | Project Riese; Lenz, Steinhage, Shcallhorn |
| Schlesiersee | Slawa | |
| Striegau | Strzegom | |
| Schweidnitz | Świdnica | |
| Tannhausen | Jedlinka, Głuszyca | Project Riese |
| Treskau | Owinska | |
| Trautenau | Trutnov | |
| Waldenburg | Wałbrzych | |
| Weisswasser | Weißwasser | |
| Wiesau | Wizów near Bolesławiec | |
| Wittichenau | Wittichenau, Bautzen | |
| Wolfsberg | Góra Włodarz (pl), Walim | Project Riese |
| Wüstegiersdorf | Głuszyca | Project Riese |
| Wüstewaltersdorf | Walim | Project Riese |
| Ziellerthal | Mysłakowice | |
| Zittau | Sieniawka, Zgorzelec County | |

== See also ==
- List of Nazi-German concentration camps
