= Project Riese =

Nazi construction project (1943–45)

Project Riese in 1944

Riese ([ˈʁiːzə]; German for "giant") was the codename given to a construction project undertaken by Nazi Germany between 1943 and 1945. Consisting of seven underground structures at Książ Castle and in the Owl Mountains in Lower Silesia, which was then Nazi Germany and is now Poland.

None of the structures were finished, and all are in different states of completion with only 11% reinforced with concrete.

The purpose of the project remains uncertain due to a lack of documentation. While some sources suggest that all the structures were part of the Führer Headquarters, others claim that it was a combination of headquarters (HQ) and arms industry facilities. However, comparison to similar facilities indicates that only the castle was adapted as an HQ or official residence, while the tunnels in the Owl Mountains were planned as an underground factory complex.

Construction work was carried out by forced labourers, prisoners of war (POWs), and concentration camp prisoners, many of whom lost their lives.

== History ==
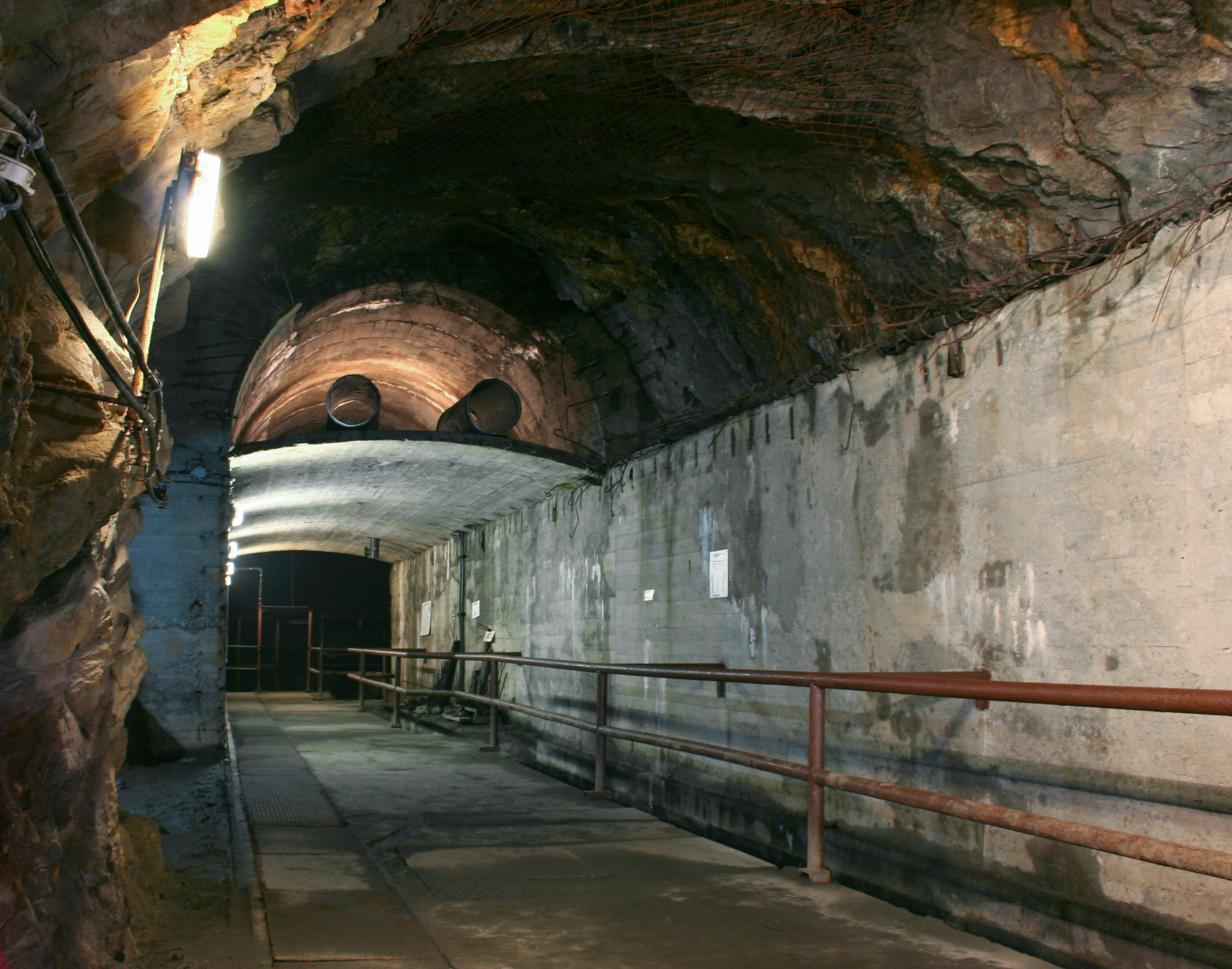
Complex Rzeczka

Due to an increase in Allied air raids, Nazi Germany relocated much of its strategic armaments production to safer regions, including the Province of Lower Silesia. The plans to protect critical infrastructure also involved transferring the arms factories to underground bunkers and constructing air-raid shelters for government officials.

In September 1943, the Minister of Armaments and War Production, Albert Speer, and senior Organisation Todt management started talks on Project Riese. The Silesian Industrial Company (Industriegemeinschaft Schlesien) was subsequently established to conduct construction work. In November, collective camps (Gemeinschaftslager, GL) were set up to house forced labourers, primarily from the Soviet Union and Poland, as well as POWs from Italy, the Soviet Union and, later, Poland, following the Warsaw Uprising (List of camps).

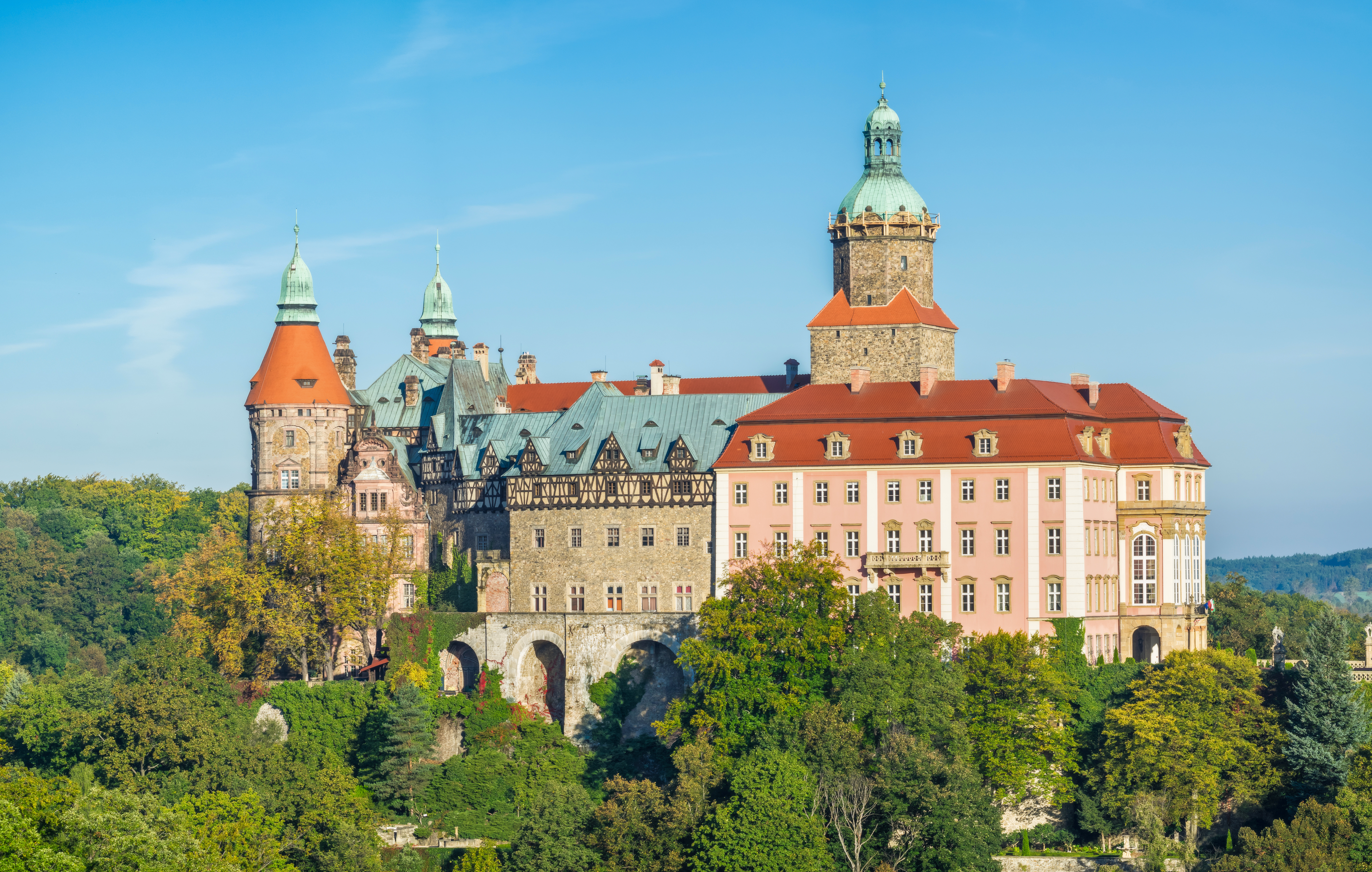
Książ Castle

A network of roads, bridges, and narrow-gauge railways was built to link the excavation sites to nearby railway stations. Prisoners were responsible for reloading building materials, cutting down trees and digging reservoirs and drainage ditches. Small dams were constructed across streams to provide water and sewage systems. Later, the mountains' rocks were drilled and blasted with explosives, and the resulting caverns were reinforced with concrete and steel. Mining specialists, mostly Germans, Italians, Ukrainians and Czechs, were employed for this purpose, but prisoners did the most dangerous and exhausting work.

Progress on digging the tunnels was slow because the Owl Mountains consist of hard gneiss. While most similar facilities were built in soft sandstone, the harder, more stable rock provided total protection from Allied air raids and the ability to construct 12 m high underground halls with a volume of 6,000 m^{3}.

A typhus epidemic occurred amongst the prisoners in December 1943. They were held in unhygienic conditions and were exhausted and starving. As a result, construction slowed down significantly. An unknown number of forced labourers and POWs worked on the project in at least five collective camps, some until the end of the war. The number of prisoners who lost their lives is uncertain.

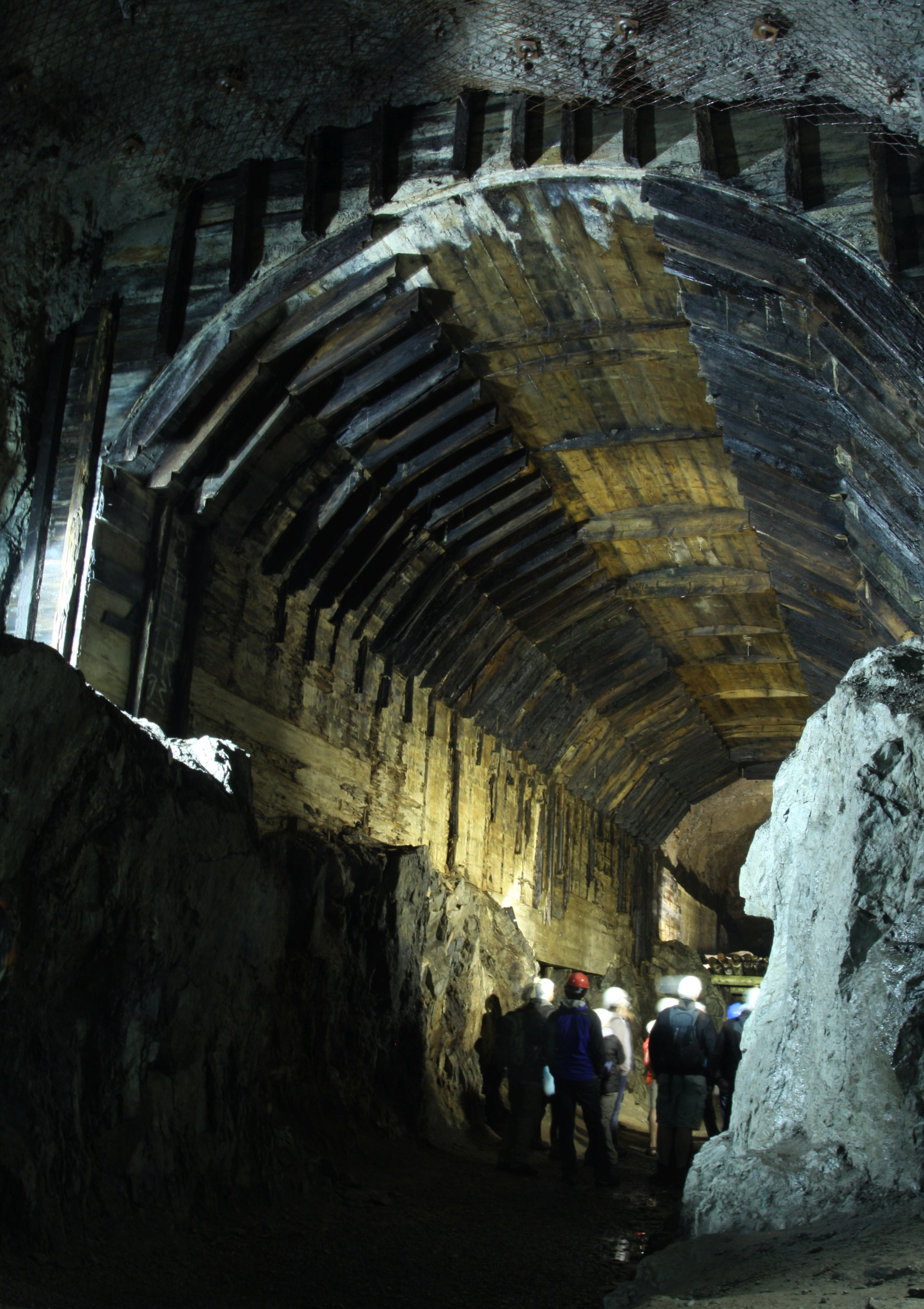
Complex Osówka

In April 1944, Adolf Hitler became dissatisfied with the progress of the project and decided to hand over supervision of the construction to the Organisation Todt, assigning prisoners from concentration camps to work on it. The prisoners were deployed to thirteen labour camps (Arbeitslager, AL), some of which were located near the tunnels. This network of camps was named Arbeitslager Riese (List of camps) and was part of the Gross-Rosen concentration camp. The AL Riese administration and camp commander, SS-Hauptsturmführer Albert Lütkemeyer, were based in AL Wüstegiersdorf. From December 1944 to January 1945, the prisoners were guarded by 853 SS troops.

According to incomplete records, at least 13,000 prisoners were employed on the project, most of whom were transferred from Auschwitz concentration camp. The documents allow 8,995 prisoners to be identified. All of these were Jewish, around 70% of whom originated from Hungary, with the remainder coming from Poland, Greece, Romania, Czechoslovakia, the Netherlands, Belgium and Germany. Mortality rates were extremely high due to disease, malnutrition, exhaustion, dangerous underground work and the treatment of prisoners by German guards. Many exhausted prisoners were sent back to Auschwitz. The deportation of 857 prisoners is documented, as are 14 executions following failed escape attempts. It is estimated that a total of 5,000 people lost their lives.

Another typhus epidemic occurred amongst the prisoners at the end of 1944. As the war front approached, the evacuation of the camps began in February 1945; however, work may have continued in a few places until the end of April. Some prisoners, mostly those who were very ill, were left behind until the Red Army arrived in the area in May 1945. Project Riese was abandoned at the initial stage of construction, with only 9 km (25,000 m^{2}, 100,000 m^{3}) of tunnels having been dug out.

== The individual structures of the project ==
The German codenames of these structures are unknown due to a lack of documentation. Polish names were created after the war.

=== Książ Castle ===
Complex Książ

Książ Castle (German: Fürstenstein) (50°50′32″N 16°17′32″E) is located in the city of Wałbrzych (German: Waldenburg). During the interwar period, its last owners were Hans Heinrich XV, Prince of Pless, and his English wife, Mary-Theresa Olivia Cornwallis-West (Princess Daisy), who were part of the Hochberg family, one of the wealthiest and most influential European dynasties. Their extravagant lifestyle and the global economic crisis resulted in them falling into debt.

In 1941, the Nazi government seized the castle and its lands, partly to pay taxes and partly as punishment for their sons' perceived treason. At that time, one of the sons was serving in the British Army and another in the Polish Armed Forces in the West. Under the leadership of architect Hermann Giesler, the castle was first adapted to accommodate the management of the state-owned railways (Deutsche Reichsbahn), but in 1944 it became part of Project Riese. Between 1941 and 1944, parts of the Prussian State Library's collection were also hidden there.

The castle underwent extensive works, which led to the destruction of many decorative elements. New staircase and lift shafts were built to improve emergency evacuation routes. However, the most serious work took place below the castle. There are two levels of tunnels. The first level is 15 m underground and was accessible from the fourth floor of the castle via a lift, a staircase from the cellar, or an entrance from the gardens. The tunnel (80 m, 180 m^{2}, 400 m^{3}), which is reinforced with concrete, leads to a hidden elevator shaft located 15 m beneath the courtyard. This shaft (35 m) connects the first and second underground levels. It has not yet been explored, as it is currently filled with rubble. A short, provisional tunnel was dug from the gardens to assist in its excavation.

The second underground level (950 m, 3,200 m^{2}, 13,000 m^{3}) is 53 m below the courtyard. Four tunnels have been dug into the base of the hill: 1. (88 m), 2. (42 m), 3. (85 m), 4. (70 m). The complex contains large tunnels (5 m high and 5.6 m wide) and four chambers. 75% of it is reinforced with concrete. There are two additional shafts leading to the surface: one measuring 3.5 m x 3.5 m (45 m) and the other with a diameter of 0.5 m (40 m). The latter is currently used to supply electricity.

Above ground, the remains of buildings and machinery can be found, as well as two water reservoirs, a pumping station and the remains of a sewage treatment plant. Four bunkers Ringstand 58c and a guardroom were demolished in 1975–1976. After the war, the narrow-gauge railway connecting the tunnels with the railway siding in the village of Lubiechów (German: Liebichau) was dismantled.

AL Fürstenstein (50°50′15″N 16°18′5″E) was established in the vicinity of the castle in May 1944. Between 700 and 1,000 concentration camp prisoners lived in the barracks. They were Jewish citizens of Hungary, Poland and Greece. The camp was evacuated in February 1945.

The castle and its underground areas are open to the public today. The second level houses seismological and geodetic measuring equipment belonging to the Polish Academy of Sciences.

=== Complex Rzeczka ===
Complex Rzeczka

The complex is located inside Ostra Mountain (German: Spitzenberg) (50°41′19″N 16°26′40″E), between the villages of Rzeczka (German: Dorfbach) and Walim (German: Wüstewaltersdorf). Drilling work began there in March 1944. Three tunnels were bored into the base of the mountain. The structure contains a nearly completed guardroom and large underground halls with heights of up to 10 m. The total length of the tunnels is 500 m (2,500 m^{2}, 14,000 m^{3}), 11% of which is reinforced with concrete.

The foundations of machinery and a concrete bridge can be seen above ground. The second bridge was damaged and replaced with a footbridge. The narrow-gauge railway, which was used to transport spoil to a nearby heap, was dismantled after the war. The underground area was opened to the public in 1995 and transformed into a museum in 2001.

In November 1943, the GL I Wüstewaltersdorf was set up in the Websky, Hartmann & Wiesen AG textile factory. The prisoners were forced labourers, mainly from the Soviet Union and Poland, as well as POWs from Italy who had been captured by the German army after switching sides following the Italian armistice. The largest group was made up of POWs from the Soviet Union. They were detained in a section of the camp that was part of Stalag VIII-A Görlitz. The camp was liberated in May 1945.

In April 1944, the AL Wüstewaltersdorf (50°41′50″N 16°26′41″E) was established in the same location to hold prisoners from concentration camps, primarily Jews from Greece. While some sources suggest that the camp was located on the slopes of Chłopska Mountain (German: Stenzelberg), others cast doubt on its existence.

=== Complex Włodarz ===
Complex Włodarz

The complex is located inside Włodarz Mountain (German: Wolfsberg) (50°42′8″N 16°25′4″E). It consists of a grid of tunnels (3,100 m, 10,700 m^{2}, 42,000 m^{3}) and large underground halls, some of which are up to 12 m high. Less than 1% of it is reinforced with concrete. Four tunnels were bored into the base of the mountain to provide access, and there are chambers for guardrooms. There is a 4 m diameter shaft (40 m) leading to the surface. Some tunnels have higher second levels, which are connected by small shafts. This is an example of the stages involved in building underground halls. Two tunnels were bored, one above the other, and then the ceiling was collapsed to create a large space. Some parts of the complex are flooded, but can be accessed by boat. It has been open to visitors since 2004.

Above ground, the foundations of machinery and numerous unfinished or destroyed buildings remain, as well as a bunker, two water reservoirs and depots of building materials, including thousands of fossilised bags of cement. The network of narrow-gauge railways connecting the tunnels to the railway siding in the village of Olszyniec (German: Erlenbusch) was dismantled and sold for scrap after the war.

In May 1944, the AL Wolfsberg (50°42′14″N 16°25′26″E) was established, probably by taking over an existing camp belonging to the Organization Schmelt. Around 3,000 concentration camp prisoners lived in plywood tents, each 3 m in diameter and housing 20 people, as well as in several barracks. The prisoners were mainly Jewish people from Hungary and Poland, but also from Greece, Czechoslovakia, Germany and Romania. The ruins of concrete barracks intended for SS guards can still be found near the camp. The evacuation of the prisoners began in February 1945.

=== Complex Osówka ===
Complex Osówka

The complex is located inside Osówka Mountain (German: Säuferhöhen) (50°40′22″N 16°25′14″E). It is accessible via tunnel number 1 (120 m), which has chambers that were intended to serve as guardrooms, and tunnel number 2 (456 m), which starts 10 m below the main underground level and has guardrooms that are almost complete. Behind these guardrooms, there is a connection between two levels created by the collapse of the ceiling.

The structure comprises a grid of tunnels (1,750 m, 6,700 m^{2}, 30,000 m^{3}) and underground halls, some of which are up to 8 m high. Only 6.9% of it is reinforced with concrete. There is a 6 m diameter (48 m) shaft leading to the surface. Tunnel number 3 (107 m) is not connected to the complex. It is located 500 m away and 45 m below the main underground area. It contains two dams and hydraulic equipment of an unknown purpose.

Above ground, there are the foundations of buildings and machinery, as well as a ramp for transporting mine cars to different levels. There is also a water reservoir and depots, some of which have systems for heating building materials in winter. The largest structure is a single-storey concrete building (680 m^{2}, 2,300 m^{3}) with 0.5 m thick walls and a roof adapted for camouflage by vegetation (0.6 m). A utility tunnel (1.25 m x 1.95 m, 30 m) was under construction to connect it with the shaft. Another structure of unknown purpose is a concrete monolith (30.9 m x 29.8 m) with dozens of pipes, drains and culverts buried at least 4.5 m into the rock. A narrow-gauge railway network connected the tunnels with the railway station in the village of Głuszyca Górna (German: Oberwüstegiersdorf). The complex has been open to the public since 1996.

In August 1944, the AL Säuferwasser (50°40′17″N 16°24′50″E) was set up for prisoners from concentration camps. They were Jewish citizens of Poland, Hungary and Greece. The remains of the camp can still be found near tunnel number 3. The camp was evacuated in February 1945.

=== Complex Sokolec ===
Complex Sokolec

The complex is located inside Gontowa Mountain (German: Schindelberg), near the village of Sokolec (German: Falkenberg). It consists of two underground structures at different levels. Tunnels 1 and 2 (50°38′44″N 16°27′36″E) lead to underground chambers that were intended to serve as guardrooms and reach heights of up to 5 m. The complex was bored in soft sandstone, so it has collapsed in many places.

Excavation of tunnel number 3 (145 m) (50°38′35″N 16°28′2″E) began in 2011. It had been inaccessible since the end of the war due to its collapsed entrance. It is located 600 m away and 60 m below tunnels 1 and 2. Tunnel number 4 (100 m), one of only two short tunnels found with mining equipment from 1945, was opened in 1994. It is located 250 m from tunnel 3 on the same level, but the two tunnels are not connected. The total length of the complex is 1,090 m (3,025 m^{2}, 7,562 m^{3}), and it is not reinforced with concrete.

Above ground, there are the foundations of buildings and machinery, as well as two ramps for transporting mine cars to different levels. A retaining wall (47 m) has been built to support the new road. A narrow-gauge railway connected the tunnels to the railway siding in the village of Ludwikowice Kłodzkie (German: Ludwigsdorf).

In April 1944, the AL Falkenberg (50°38′39″N 16°28′16″E) was established in the hamlet of Sowina (German: Eule) to hold prisoners from concentration camps. Around 1,500 men of Jewish origin from Poland, Hungary and Greece lived there. The camp was evacuated in February 1945.

=== Complex Jugowice ===
Complex Jugowice

The complex is located inside Dział Jawornicki Mountain (German: Mittelberg) (50°42′35″N 16°25′12″E), in the village of Jugowice (Jawornik) (German: Hausdorf (Jauering)). Tunnels 2 (109 m) and 4 lead to a small underground level. There is a 0.5 m – 0.6 m diameter shaft (16 m) in the vicinity of the complex, but it is not connected to it. Tunnel number 6 has collapsed 37 m from the entrance and has not yet been explored. It was closed by two steel doors, 7 m apart. The rest of the tunnels are in the initial stage of construction: 1. (10 m), 3. (15 m), 5. (3 m), 7. (24.5 m). The total length of the structure is 460 m (1,360 m^{2}, 4,200 m^{3}), of which less than 1% is reinforced with concrete.

Above ground, the foundations of buildings and machinery can be seen, as well as a pumping station and a water reservoir. A narrow-gauge railway connected the tunnels to the railway siding in the village of Olszyniec (German: Erlenbusch), where the AL Erlenbusch (50°43′32″N 16°22′57″E) was established in May 1944. Between 500 and 700 concentration camp prisoners lived in five barracks. They were Jewish citizens of Hungary and Poland. The camp was liberated in May 1945.

=== Complex Soboń ===
Complex Soboń

The complex is located inside Soboń Mountain (German: Ramenberg) (50°41′7″N 16°23′58″E) and can be accessed via tunnels 1 (216 m) and 2 (170 m). Tunnel number 3 is not connected to the main underground area. Its initial 83 m length has collapsed, but in 2013, a shaft was dug from above, revealing 86 m of tunnel containing mining equipment from 1945. The total length of the complex is 700 m (1,900 m^{2}, 4,000 m^{3}), less than 1% of which is reinforced with concrete.

Above ground, the remains of machinery and a pumping station can be seen, as well as a water reservoir, depots of building materials, numerous unfinished or destroyed buildings, a bunker and large-scale earthworks. A narrow-gauge railway network connected the tunnels with the railway station in the village of Głuszyca Górna (German: Oberwüstegiersdorf). Between October and December 1944, the AL Lärche (50°41′12″N 16°24′17″E) was established for prisoners from concentration camps, primarily Jews from Poland and Greece. They lived in twelve plywood barracks near tunnel number 3. The camp was evacuated in February 1945.

=== Jedlinka Palace ===
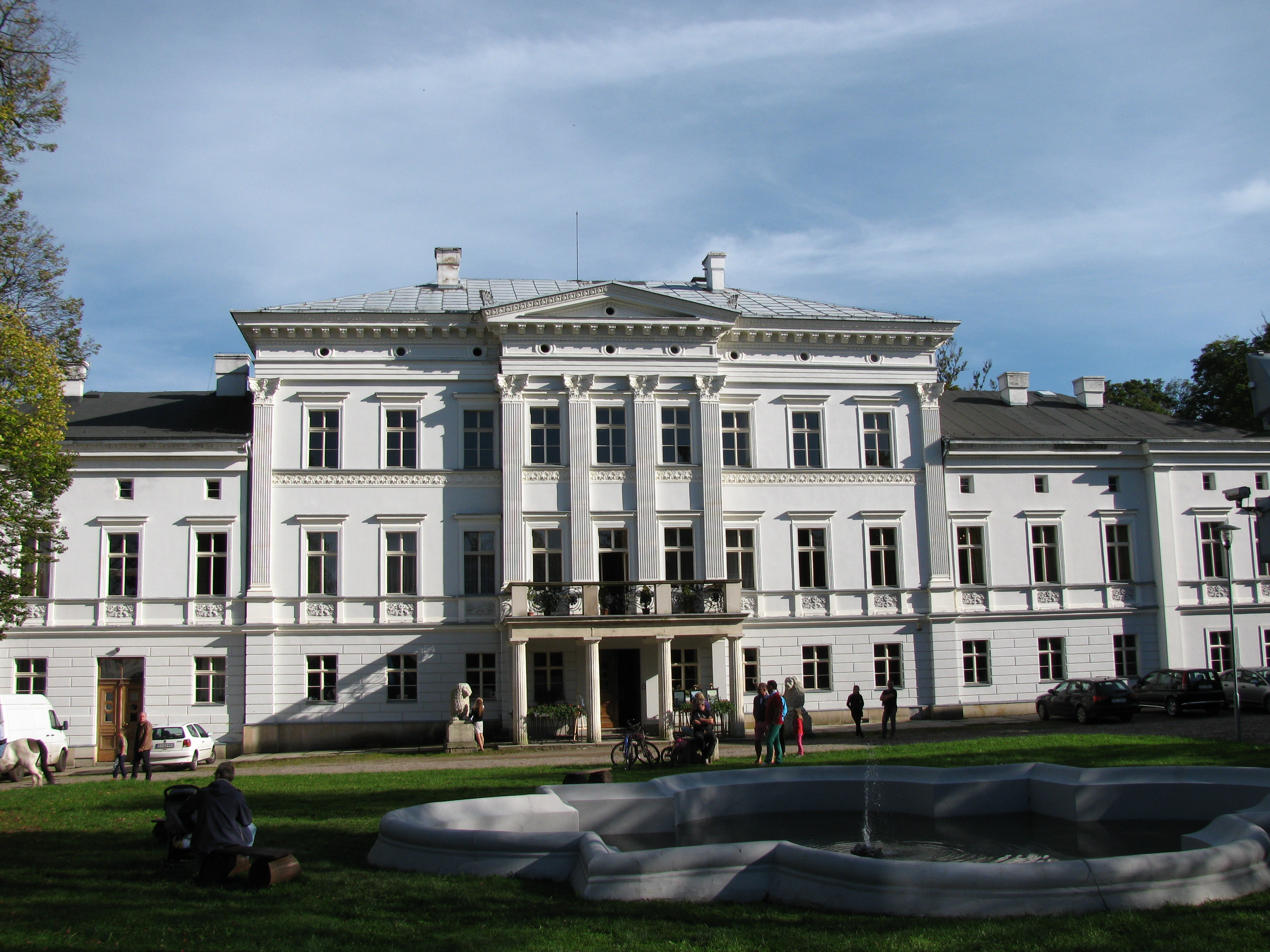
Jedlinka Palace

The palace is located in the village of Jedlinka (German: Tannhausen) (50°42′44.28″N 16°21′33.52″E). In 1943, the Nationalsozialistische Volkswohlfahrt (National Socialist People's Welfare) purchased it from the Böhm family due to their financial difficulties. However, at the beginning of 1944, plans to transform the palace into a hospital were disrupted when the building was confiscated by the military and converted into headquarters for Industriegemeinschaft Schlesien (Silesian Industrial Company), which had previously occupied Haus Hermannshöhe in the nearby town of Bad Charlottenbrunn (Polish: Jedlina-Zdrój).

An air-raid shelter with armoured, gas-proof doors was created in the cellar. The corporation was responsible for the construction work, as well as for supervising all the companies and local businesses that took part in the project on behalf of the Main Building Commission of the Ministry of Arms. (List of companies) Most companies used forced labour.

In April 1944, the Industriegemeinschaft Schlesien was deemed too inefficient and was replaced by the Organisation Todt (OT). The Oberbauleitung Riese (OBL Riese) (Site management Riese) was established under the supervision of Ministerial Director Franz Xaver Dorsch and Hans Meyer, Chief of the OBL Riese and of the entire Lower Silesia area. The Construction Office, which was located in Haus Mohaupt in the town of Wüstewaltersdorf (Polish: Walim), was overseen by senior construction managers Leo Müller and Fritz Leonhardt. By July 1944, 30,788 people were employed by OBL Riese.

In February 1945, as the war front approached, OBL Riese evolved into the headquarters of the Front-OT X Brigade. The new formation's task was to reconstruct damaged communication systems. The OT occupied the palace until May 1945. It is currently open to the public.

=== Głuszyca ===
Air raid shelter in Głuszyca

The town of Głuszyca (German: Wüstegiersdorf) and the surrounding area were home to many labour camps connected to Project Riese. From October 1943 to March 1945, manufacturing plants belonging to Friedrich Krupp AG were relocated here from Essen. The company took over two textile factories belonging to Meyer-Kauffmann Textilwerke AG and adapted them for the production of armaments. An air-raid shelter was constructed inside a nearby hill (50°41′13″N 16°22′38″E). Consisting of two tunnels, 60% of it is reinforced with concrete and bricks. (240 m, 600 m^{2}, 1,800 m^{3}).

In November 1943, the GL III Wüstegiersdorf (50°41′5″N 16°22′21″E) was established for Soviet prisoners of war in the Kammgarnspinnerei Stöhr & Co. AG textile factory, and it existed until the end of the war. In April 1944, AL Wüstegiersdorf was set up at the same location to hold prisoners from concentration camps. Between 700 and 1,000 Jews from Hungary and Poland were held there. The camp also served as a main storehouse for food and clothing, as well as an administrative centre and the headquarters of the commander of AL Riese. The camp was evacuated in February 1945.

GL II Dörnhau (50°40′7″N 16°23′36″E) was established in the village of Kolce (German: Dörnhau) in November 1943. The camp was located in a closed textile factory owned by the Giersch brothers and was inhabited by forced labourers from Poland and the Soviet Union. In June 1944, AL Dörnhau was set up in the same location to hold concentration camp prisoners of Jewish origin from Hungary, Poland and Greece. Several barracks were added. That autumn, the camp was also designated a central infirmary for the severely ill with no prospect of recovery. After the war, twenty-five local mass graves containing 1,943 victims were excavated. The camps were liberated in May 1945.

GL IV Oberwüstegiersdorf (50°40′27″N 16°22′44″E) was established in the village of Głuszyca Górna (German: Oberwüstegiersdorf) in November 1943. Located in the building of a closed textile factory, the camp existed until the end of the war. The prisoners were forced labourers and POWs. Between April and May 1944, AL Schotterwerk (50°40′18″N 16°22′4″E) was created in the same village, near the railway station, to hold prisoners from concentration camps. Between 1,200 and 1,300 Jews from Hungary, Poland and Greece were accommodated in eight to eleven wooden barracks. Some of the prisoners joined the evacuation column in February 1945. The rest were freed in May.

In March 1944, the GL V Tannhausen (50°41′55″N 16°21′56″E) was established in the village of Jedlinka (German: Tannhausen) for forced labourers and POWs in the Websky, Hartmann & Wiesen AG textile factory. Between April and May of that year, AL Tannhausen was created in the same location for prisoners from concentration camps. Around 1,200 men of Jewish origin from Hungary, Poland, Greece and other European countries were held there. Zentralrevier Tannhausen ("central infirmary") (50°42′0″N 16°21′57″E) was set up next to the camp in November 1944. This was reserved for patients with a good chance of recovery. They were housed in four brick barracks. In February 1945, those prisoners who were able to walk were evacuated. Only the sick remained in the camp and they were liberated in May.

In August 1944, the AL Kaltwasser (50°40′30″N 16°23′14″E) was established in the village of Zimna Woda (German: Kaltwasser). Concentration camp prisoners of Jewish origin from Poland lived in five barracks. The camp was closed in December 1944 and the prisoners were transferred to AL Lärche.

Between April and June 1944, the AL Märzbachtal (50°41′16″N 16°23′16″E) was established in the Potok Marcowy Duży valley (German: Grosser Märzbachtal) for concentration camp prisoners. Between 700 and 800 Jews, mainly from Hungary and Poland, lived in barracks, the remains of which can still be seen today. The camp was evacuated in February 1945.

== Gallery ==
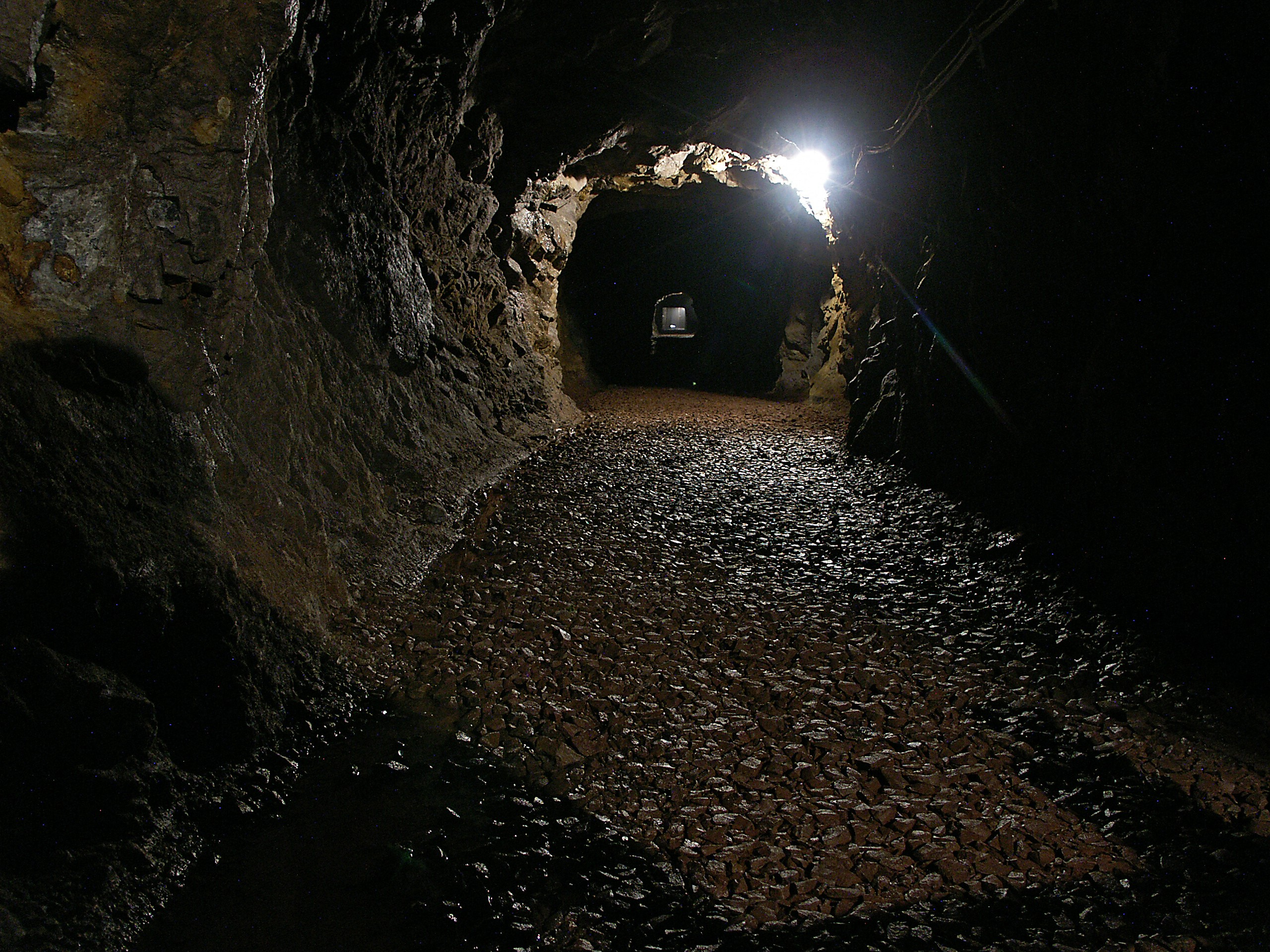
Complex Włodarz

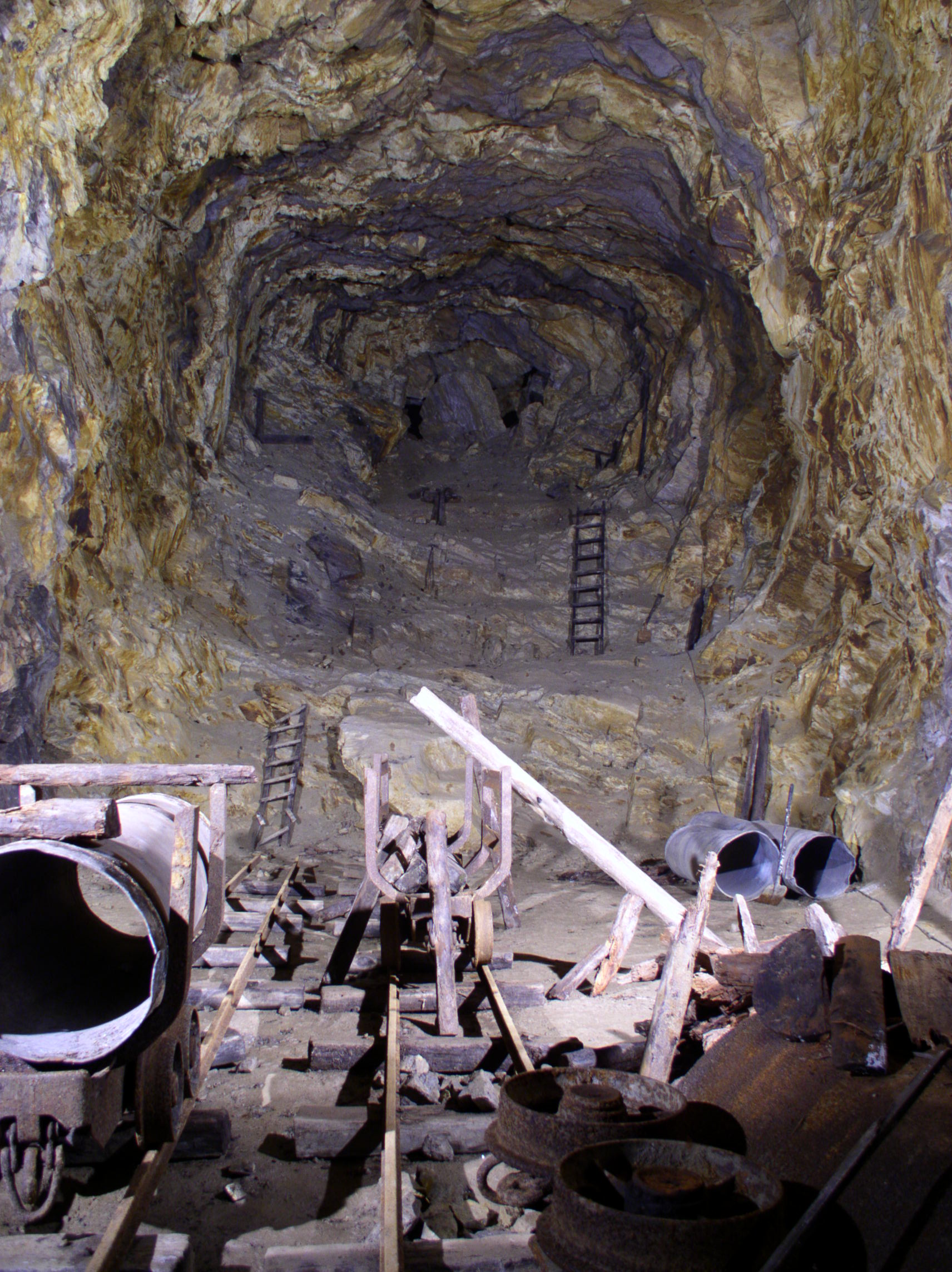
Complex Rzeczka

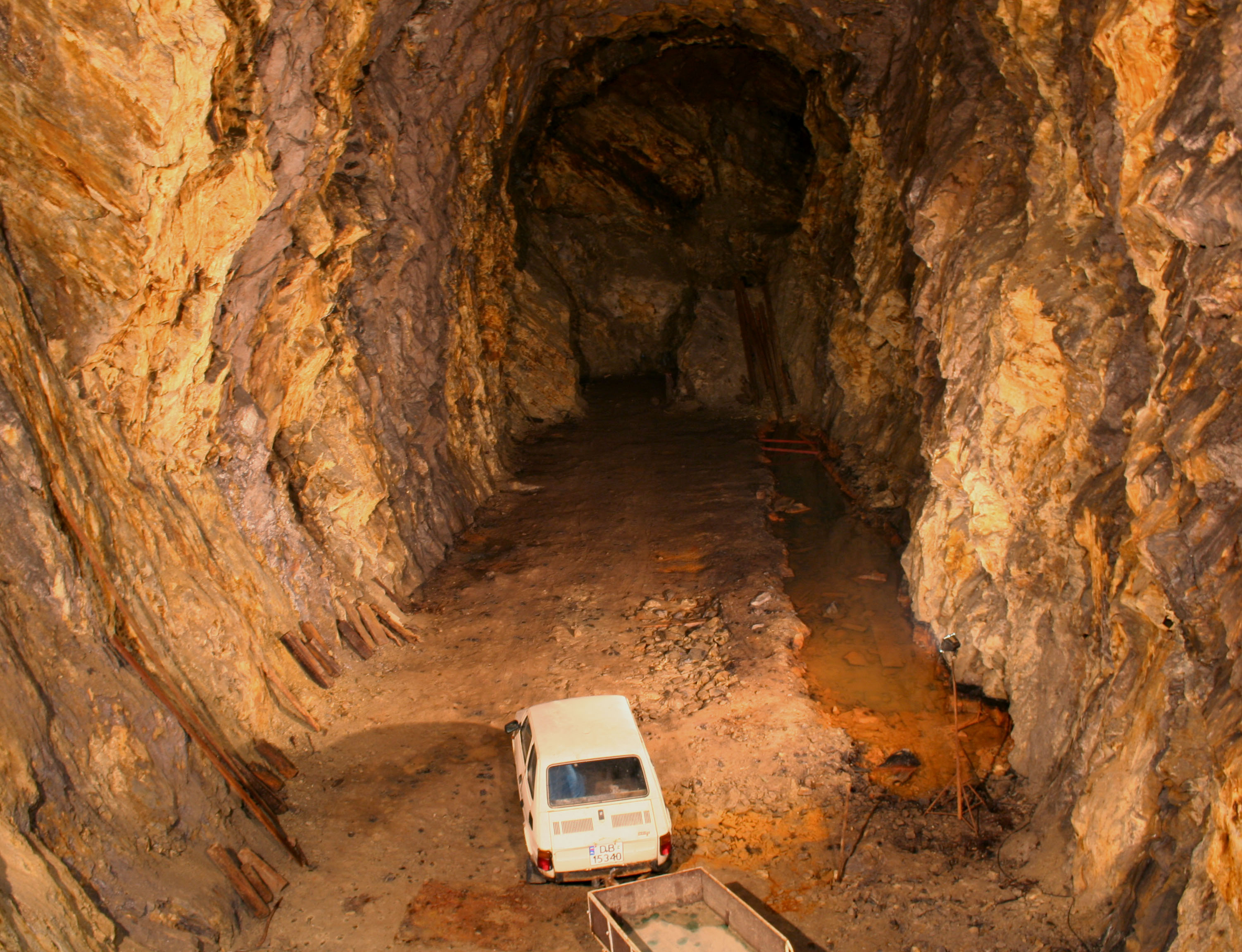
Complex Rzeczka

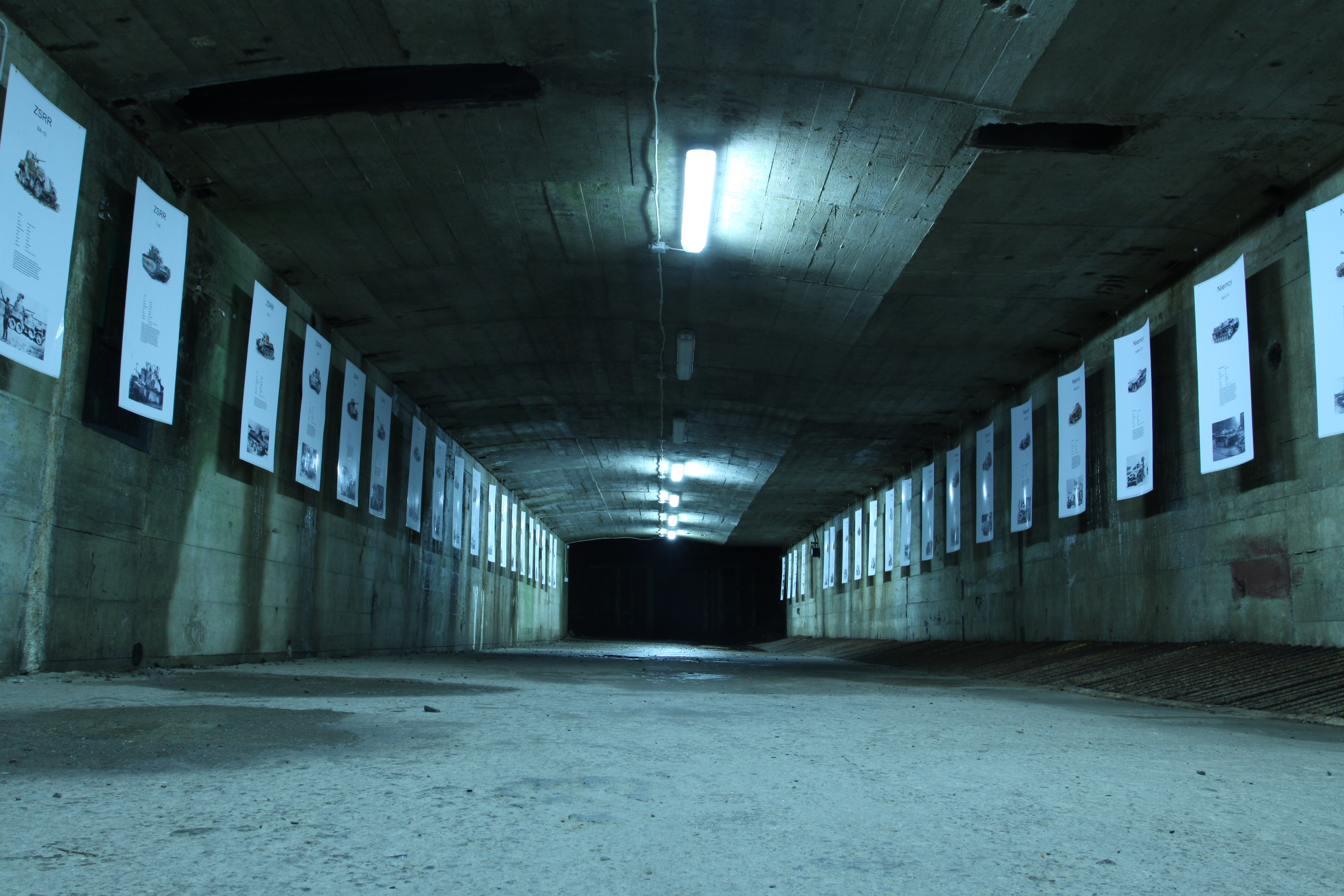
Complex Osówka

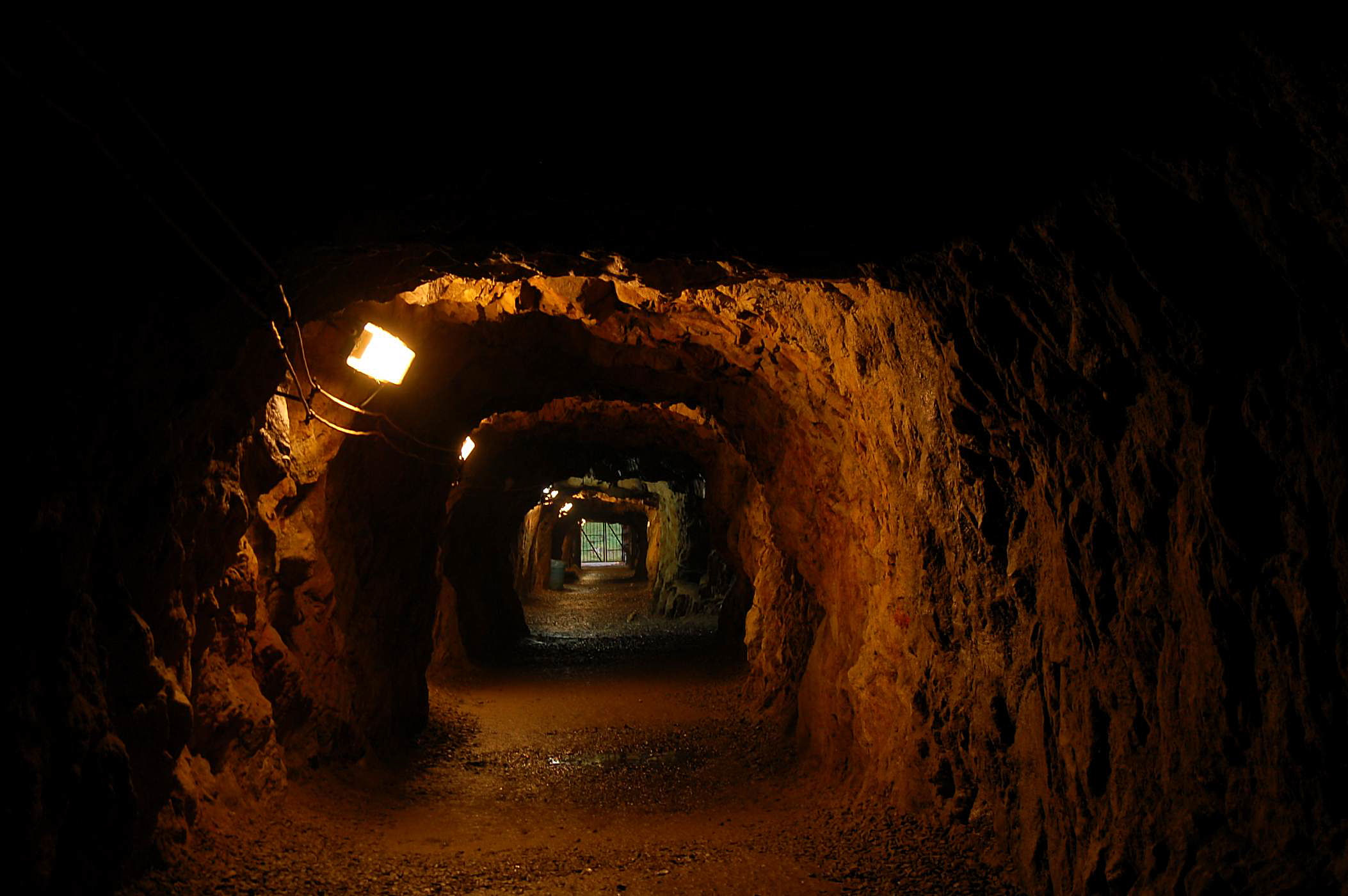
Complex Osówka

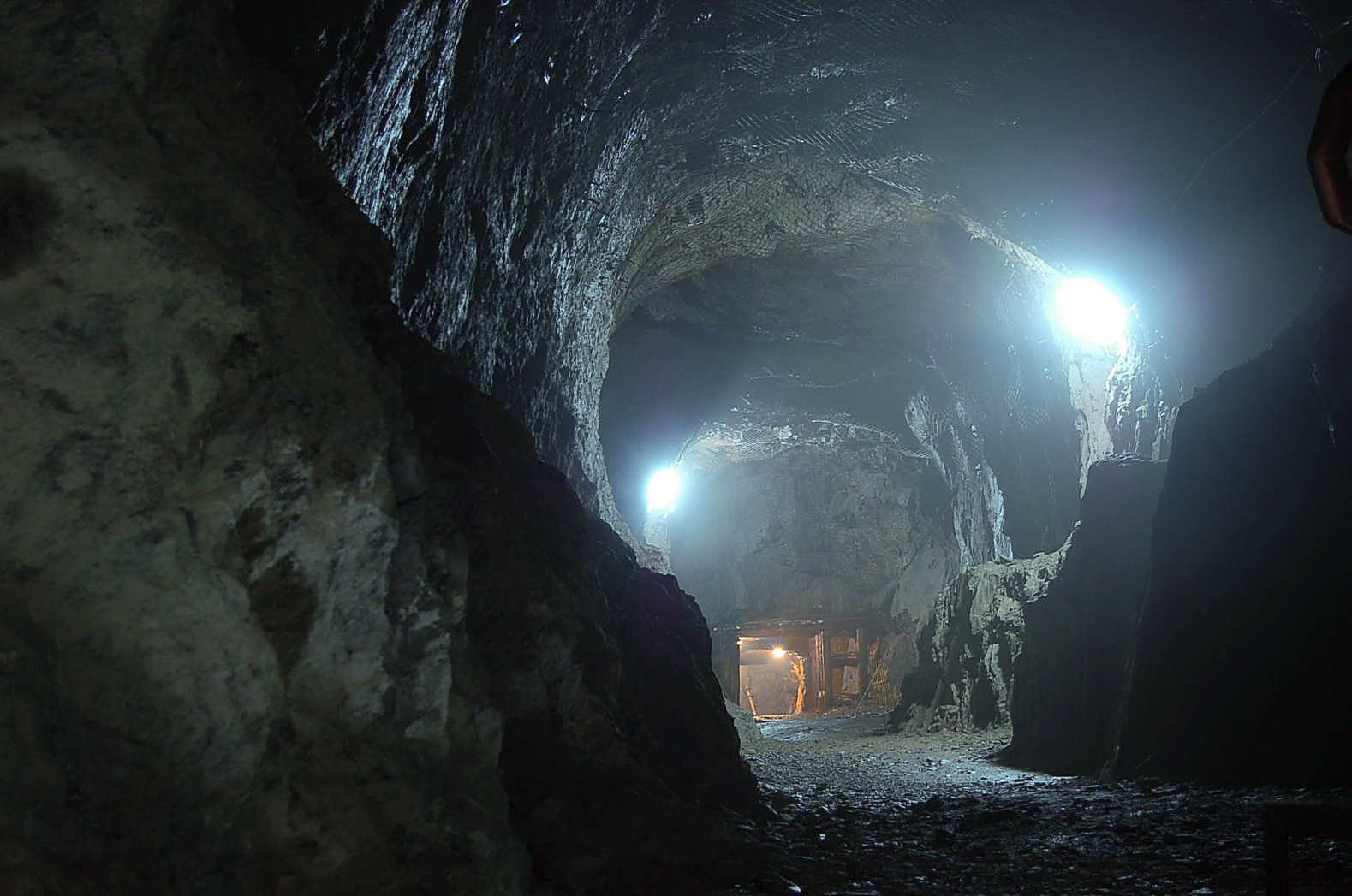
Complex Osówka

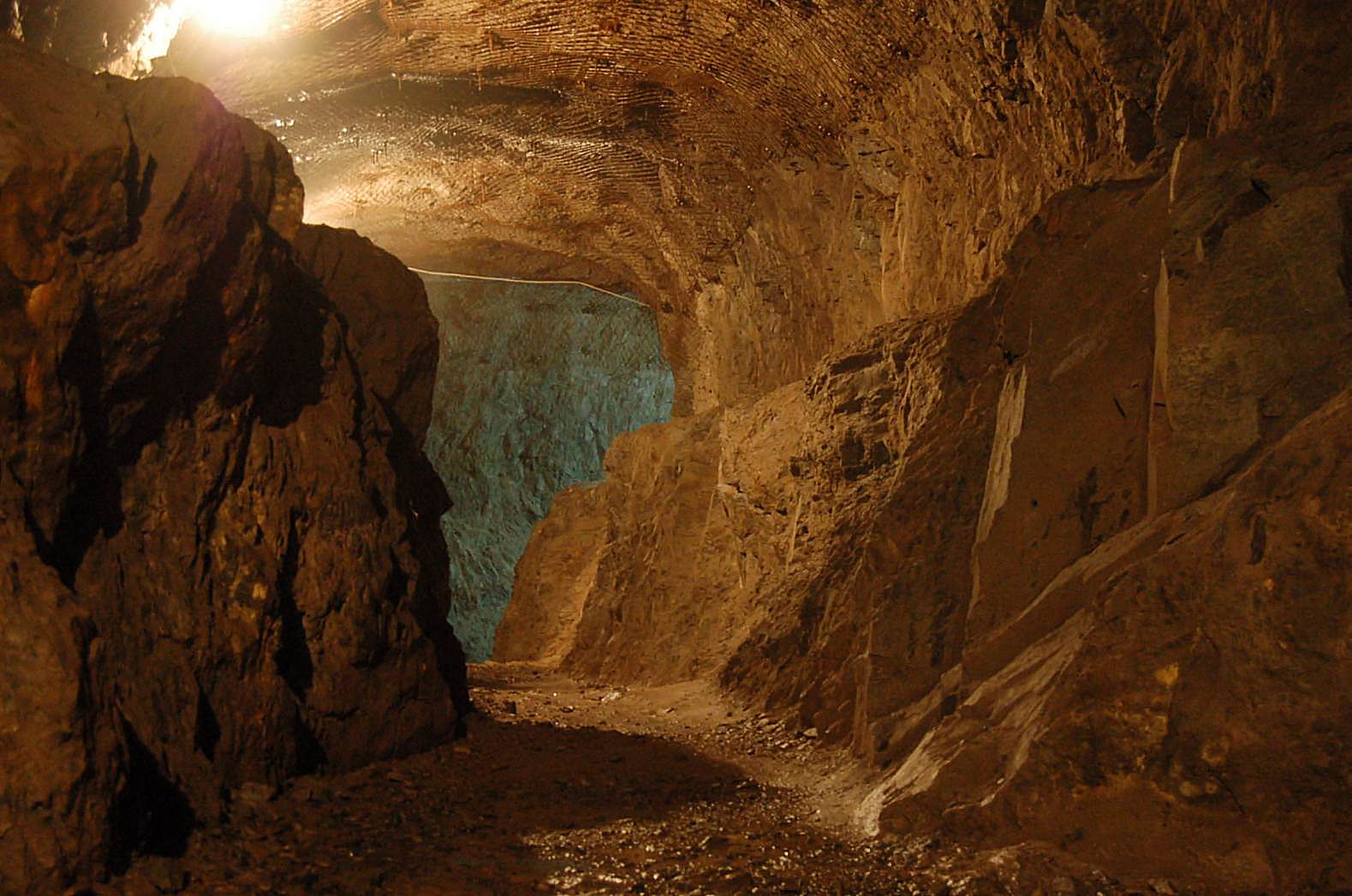
Complex Osówka

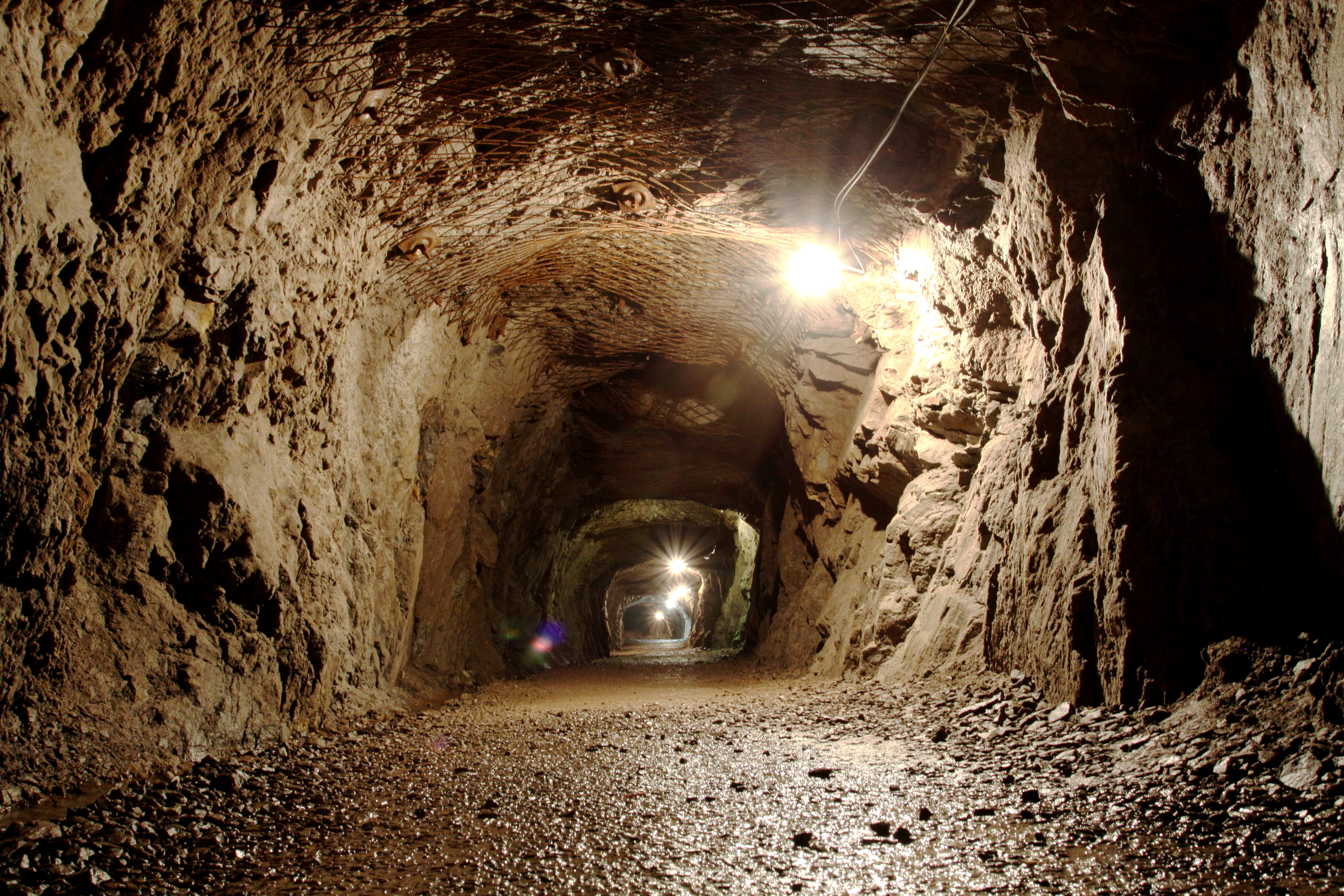
Complex Osówka

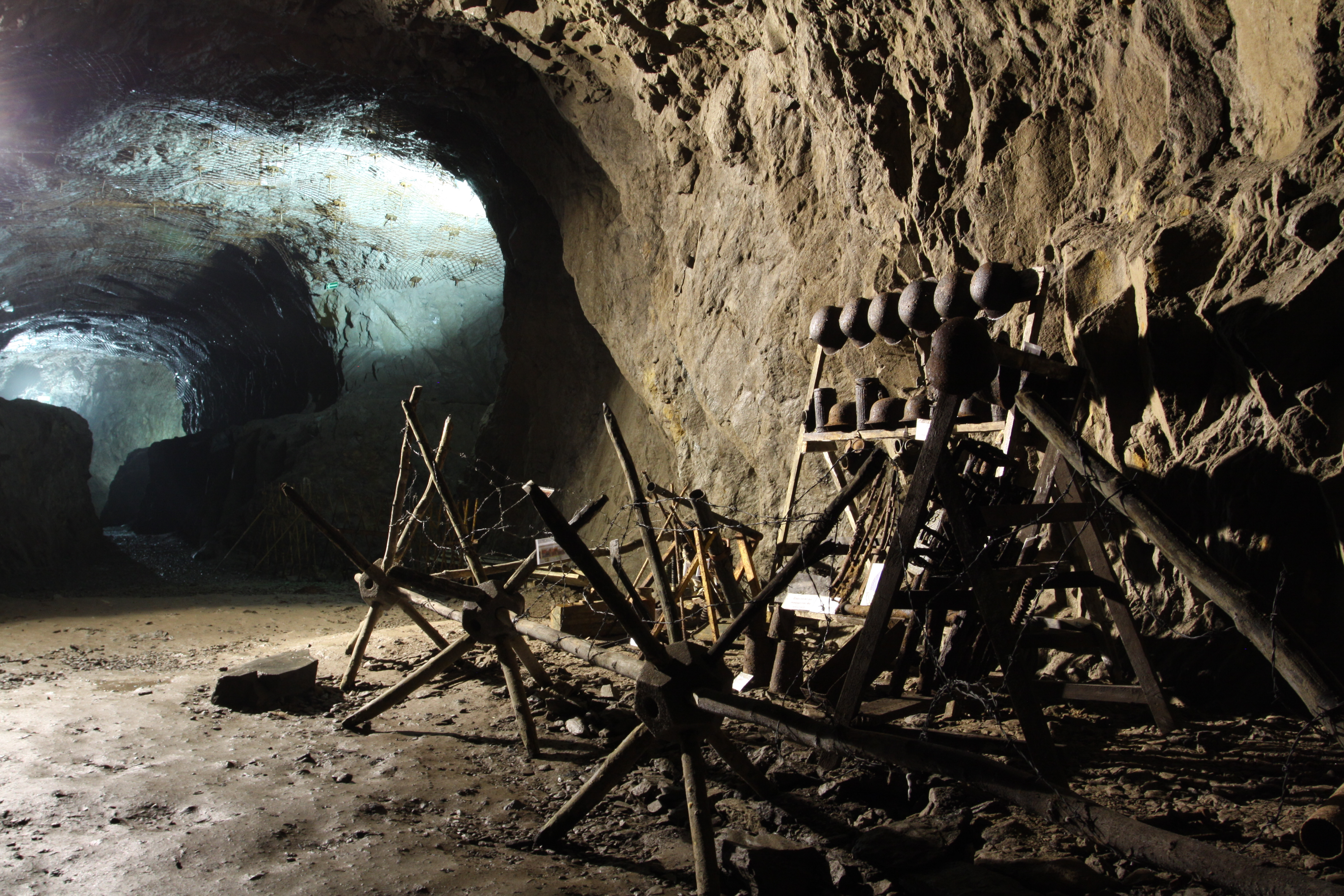
Complex Osówka

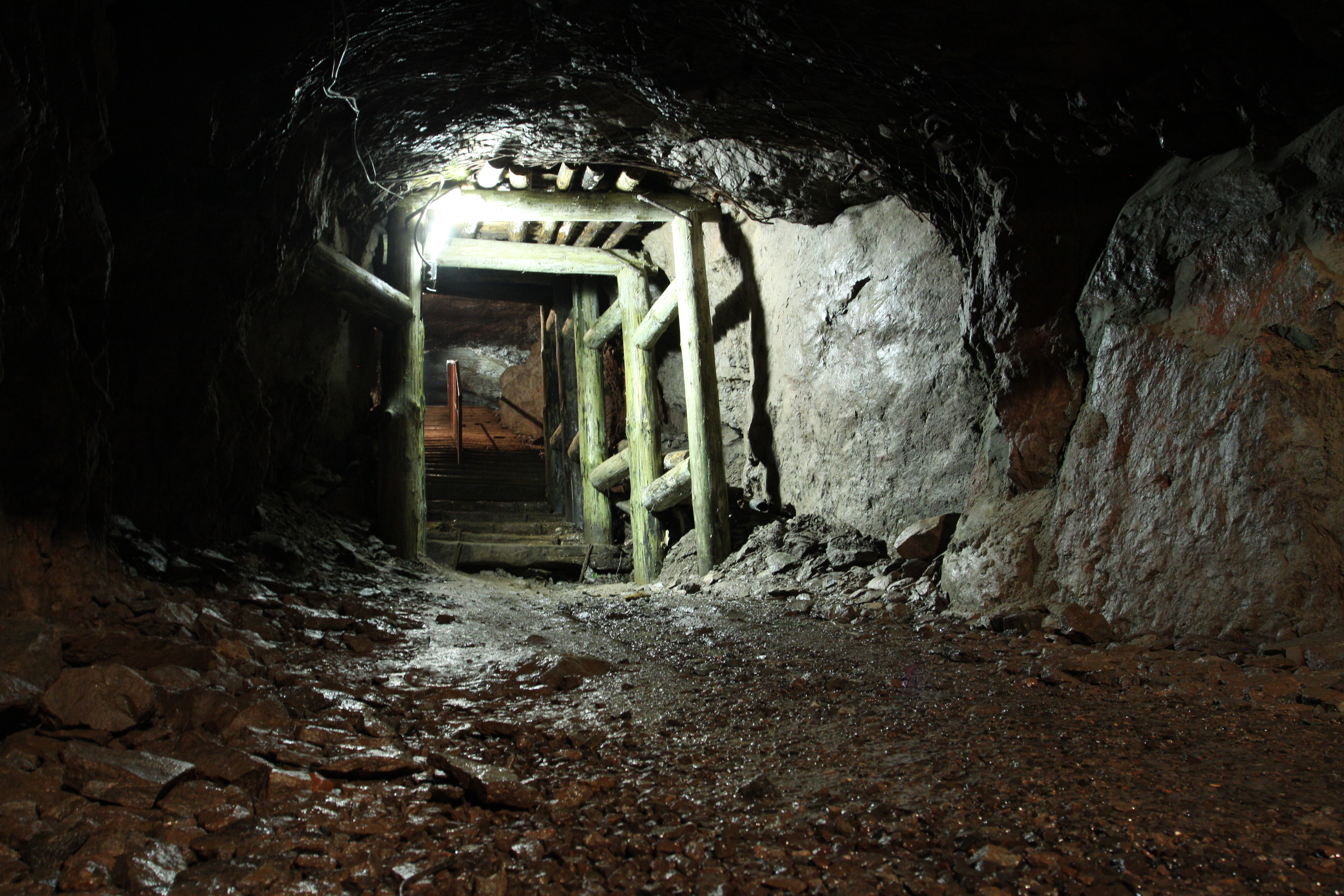
Complex Osówka

== List of camps ==
Forced labourers and POWs camps (Gemeinschaftslager)
German names	Polish place names	Coordinates	Dates of use
GL I Wüstewaltersdorf	Walim	50°41′50″N 16°26′41″E	Nov 1943 – May 1945
GL II Dörnhau	Kolce	50°40′7″N 16°23′36″E	Nov 1943 – May 1945
GL III Wüstegiersdorf	Głuszyca	50°41′5″N 16°22′21″E	Nov 1943 – May 1945
GL IV Oberwüstegiersdorf	Głuszyca Górna	50°40′27″N 16°22′44″E	Nov 1943 – May 1945
GL V Tannhausen	Jedlinka	50°41′55″N 16°21′56″E	Mar 1944 – 1945

Subcamps of Arbeitslager Riese
German names	Polish place names	Coordinates	Dates of use
AL Dörnhau	Kolce	50°40′7″N 16°23′36″E	Jun 1944 – May 1945
AL Erlenbusch	Olszyniec	50°43′32″N 16°22′57″E	May 1944 – May 1945
AL Falkenberg	Sowina	50°38′39″N 16°28′16″E	Apr 1944 – Feb 1945
AL Fürstenstein	Książ	50°50′15″N 16°18′5″E	May 1944 – Feb 1945
AL Kaltwasser	Zimna Woda	50°40′30″N 16°23′14″E	Aug 1944 – Dec 1944
AL Lärche	Soboń	50°41′12″N 16°24′17″E	Oct–Dec 1944 – Feb 1945
AL Märzbachtal	Potok Marcowy Duży	50°41′16″N 16°23′16″E	Apr–Jun 1944 – Feb 1945
AL Säuferwasser	Osówka	50°40′17″N 16°24′50″E	Aug 1944 – Feb 1945
AL Schotterwerk	Głuszyca Górna	50°40′18″N 16°22′4″E	Apr–May 1944 – May 1945
AL Tannhausen	Jedlinka	50°41′55″N 16°21′56″E	Apr–May 1944 – May 1945
AL Wolfsberg	Włodarz	50°42′14″N 16°25′26″E	May 1944 – Feb 1945
AL Wüstegiersdorf	Głuszyca	50°41′5″N 16°22′21″E	Apr 1944 – Feb 1945
AL Wüstewaltersdorf	Walim	50°41′50″N 16°26′41″E	Apr 1944 – 1945
Zentralrevier Tannhausen	Jedlinka	50°42′0″N 16°21′57″E	Nov 1944 – May 1945

== List of companies ==
The companies that took part in the project:

- Ackermann
- Albert Hoff Tiefbau-Unternehmung
- Argo-Waldenburg
- Artur Becker
- Artur Johr of Berlin
- Butzer and Holzmann
- Deutsche Hoch und Tiefbaugessellschaft
- Dübner
- Dybno
- Dynamit
- Eule
- Fix
- Friedrich Krupp
- Geppardt
- Ghiseri
- Hegerfeld
- Hoffmanswerke
- Hotze
- Humbert
- Hutto
- Jank
- Kemna und Co.
- Klaus Ackermann Tunnel-, Tief- und Eisenbahn
- Krause
- Lamm
- Lenz
- Lingen
- Messinger
- Mühlhausen
- NSKK (Nationalsozialistisches Kraftkorps)
- Otto Trebitz
- Otto Weil
- Philipp Holzmann
- Pischel
- Putzer und Holzmann
- Sager und Wörner
- Sänger und Laninger
- Schallhorn
- Schlesische Bau
- Seidenspinner
- Singer und Müller
- Steinhage
- Stohl
- Tebe und Bucer
- Tiefbau-Unternehmung Ewald Mühlhaus
- Union-Bau Schlesien Beton-Tief-Hoch und Straßenbau
- Urban
- VDM (Vereinigte Deutsche Metallwerke)
- Wayss und Freytag
- Websky
- Weiden und Petersil

== See also ==
- Gross-Rosen concentration camp
- Jonas Valley
- Mittelwerk
- Weingut I
- Kőbánya cellar system
