= Robert Radecke =

German composer and conductor

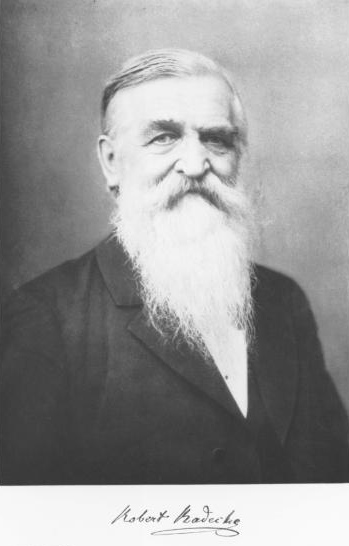

Albert Martin Robert Radecke (31 October 1830 – 21 June 1911) was a German composer and conductor.

== Biography ==
He was born in Dittmannsdorf, in Silesia, and received his musical training in the Conservatory of Leipzig. In 1853 he became musical director of the Court Theatre of Leipzig. He moved to Berlin soon after, played second violin in Ferdinand Laub's quartet, and gave many successful concerts. He was made royal Kapellmeister in 1871, and in 1891 succeeded Haupt as director of the Royal Institute for Church Music.

His older brother Rudolf (1829–1893) was also a composer.

== Works ==
An artist of ability on pianoforte, organ, and violin, Radecke is best known for his compositions, which include two orchestral overtures, König Johann and Am Strande; the operetta Die Mönchguter (premiered 1874); and, above all, for his many songs, including the often-republished "folksong" "Aus der Jugendzeit" from his opus 22 set, to a text by Friedrich Rückert.
