= Podlesie, Wałbrzych County =

Podlesie
- Village
- Location within Poland
- Coordinates: 50°44′20″N 16°21′28″E
- Country: Poland
- Voivodeship: Lower Silesian
- County: Wałbrzych
- Gmina: Walim
- Population: 333

Podlesie [pɔdˈlɛɕɛ] is a village in the administrative district of Gmina Walim, within Wałbrzych County, Lower Silesian Voivodeship, in south-western Poland.
