= Niedźwiedzice, Wałbrzych County =

Niedźwiedzica
- Village
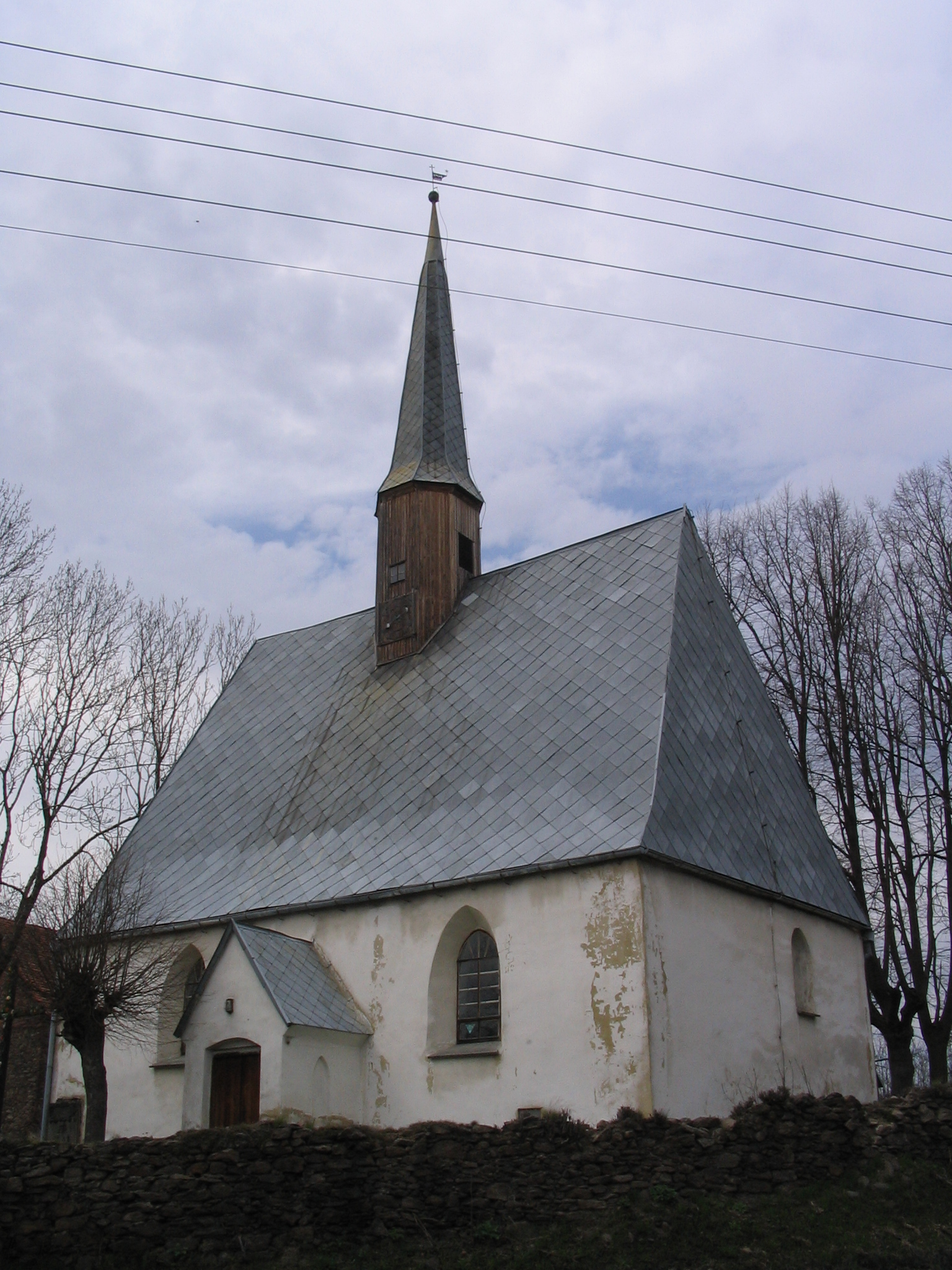
- Saint Nicholas Church

- Location within Poland
- Coordinates: 50°44′24″N 16°23′23″E
- Country: Poland
- Voivodeship: Lower Silesian
- County: Wałbrzych
- Gmina: Walim

Niedźwiedzica [ɲɛd͡ʑvjɛˈd͡ʑit͡sa] is a village in the administrative district of Gmina Walim, within Wałbrzych County, Lower Silesian Voivodeship, in south-western Poland.
