= Gmina Walim =

Gmina Walim Walim Commune
- Gmina
- Coat of arms
- Interactive map of Gmina Walim
- Coordinates (Walim): 50°41′53″N 16°26′42″E
- Country: Poland
- Voivodeship: Lower Silesian
- County: Wałbrzych
- Seat: Walim
- Sołectwos: Dziećmorowice, Glinno, Jugowice, Michałkowa, Niedźwiedzice, Olszyniec, Podlesie, Rzeczka, Walim, Zagórze Śląskie

Area
  - Total: 78.75 km^{2} (30.41 sq mi)

Population (2019-06-30)
  - Total: 5,416
  - Density: 68.77/km^{2} (178.1/sq mi)
- Website: http://walim.pl

Gmina Walim is a rural gmina (administrative district) in Wałbrzych County, Lower Silesian Voivodeship, in south-western Poland. Its seat is the village of Walim, which lies approximately 15 kilometres (9 mi) south-east of Wałbrzych, and 64 kilometres (40 mi) south-west of the regional capital Wrocław.

The gmina covers an area of 78.75 square kilometres (30.4 sq mi), and as of 2019 its total population is 5,416.

== Neighbouring gminas ==
Gmina Walim is bordered by the towns of Jedlina-Zdrój, Pieszyce and Wałbrzych, and the gminas of Głuszyca, Nowa Ruda and Świdnica.

== Villages ==
The gmina contains the villages of Dziećmorowice, Glinno, Jugowice, Michałkowa, Niedźwiedzice, Olszyniec, Podlesie, Rzeczka, Walim and Zagórze Śląskie.

== Twin towns – sister cities ==
Gmina Walim is twinned with:

- Velim, Czech Republic
