= Michałkowa =

- Village
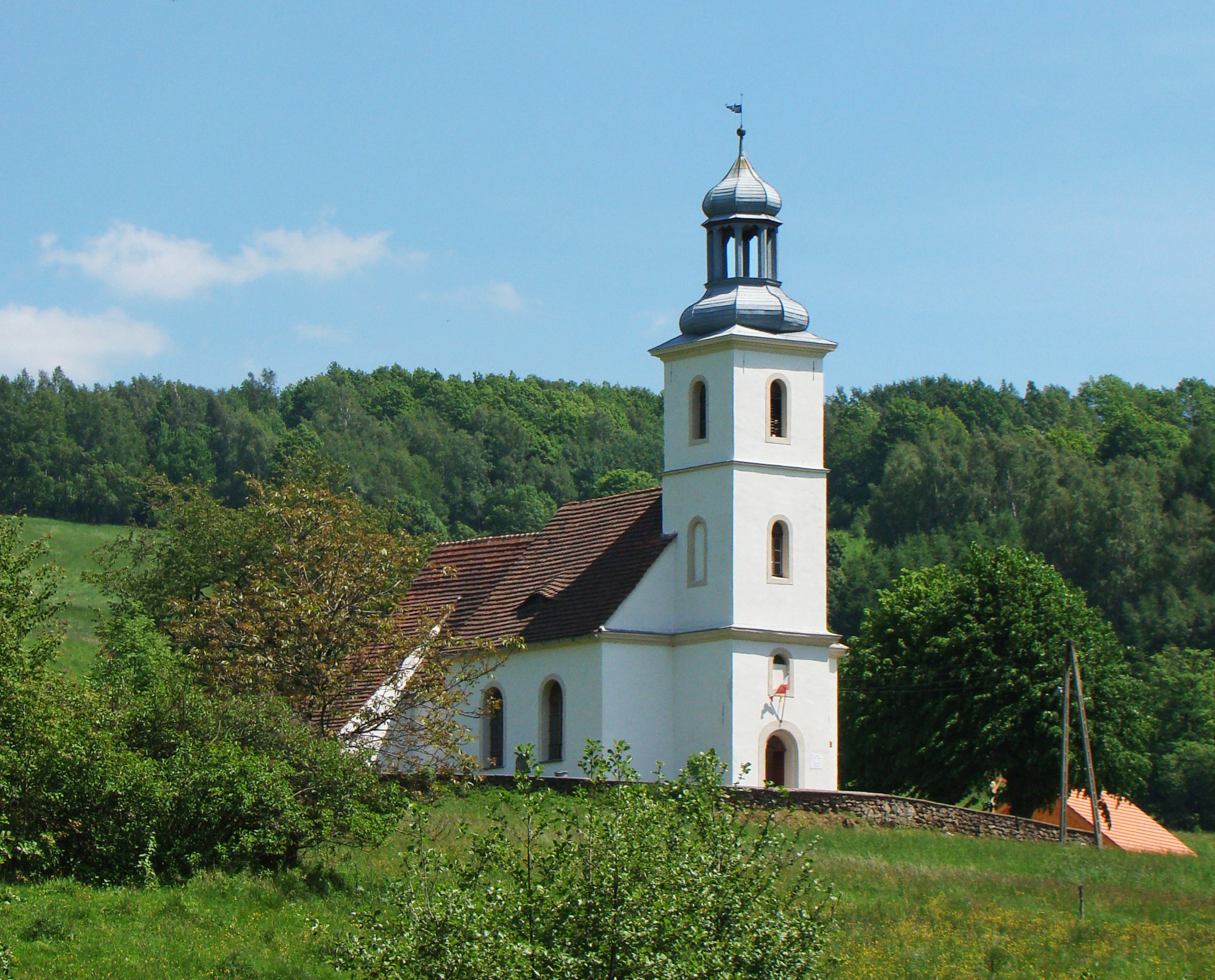
- Church of Saint Anne

- Location within Poland
- Coordinates: 50°45′N 16°27′E
- Country: Poland
- Voivodeship: Lower Silesian
- County: Wałbrzych
- Gmina: Walim

Michałkowa [mixau̯ˈkɔva] is a village in the administrative district of Gmina Walim, within Wałbrzych County, Lower Silesian Voivodeship, in south-western Poland.
