= Glinno, Lower Silesian Voivodeship =

Glinno
- Village
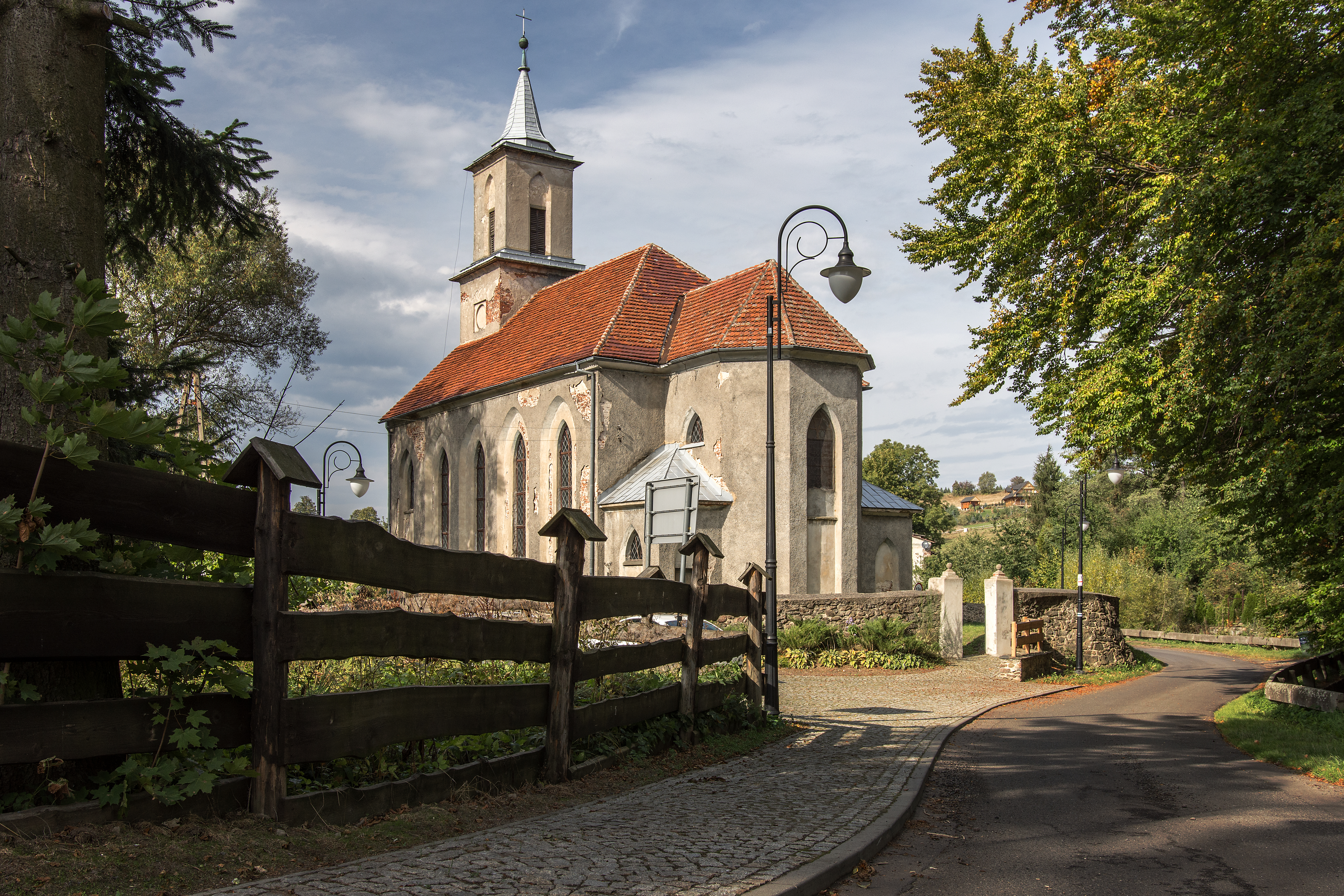
- Our Lady of Sorrows Church

- Location within Poland
- Coordinates: 50°43′13″N 16°28′21″E
- Country: Poland
- Voivodeship: Lower Silesian
- County: Wałbrzych
- Gmina: Walim
- Population (approx.): 150

Glinno [ˈɡlinnɔ] is a village in the administrative district of Gmina Walim, within Wałbrzych County, Lower Silesian Voivodeship, in south-western Poland.

The village has an approximate population of 150.
