= Dziećmorowice =

- Village
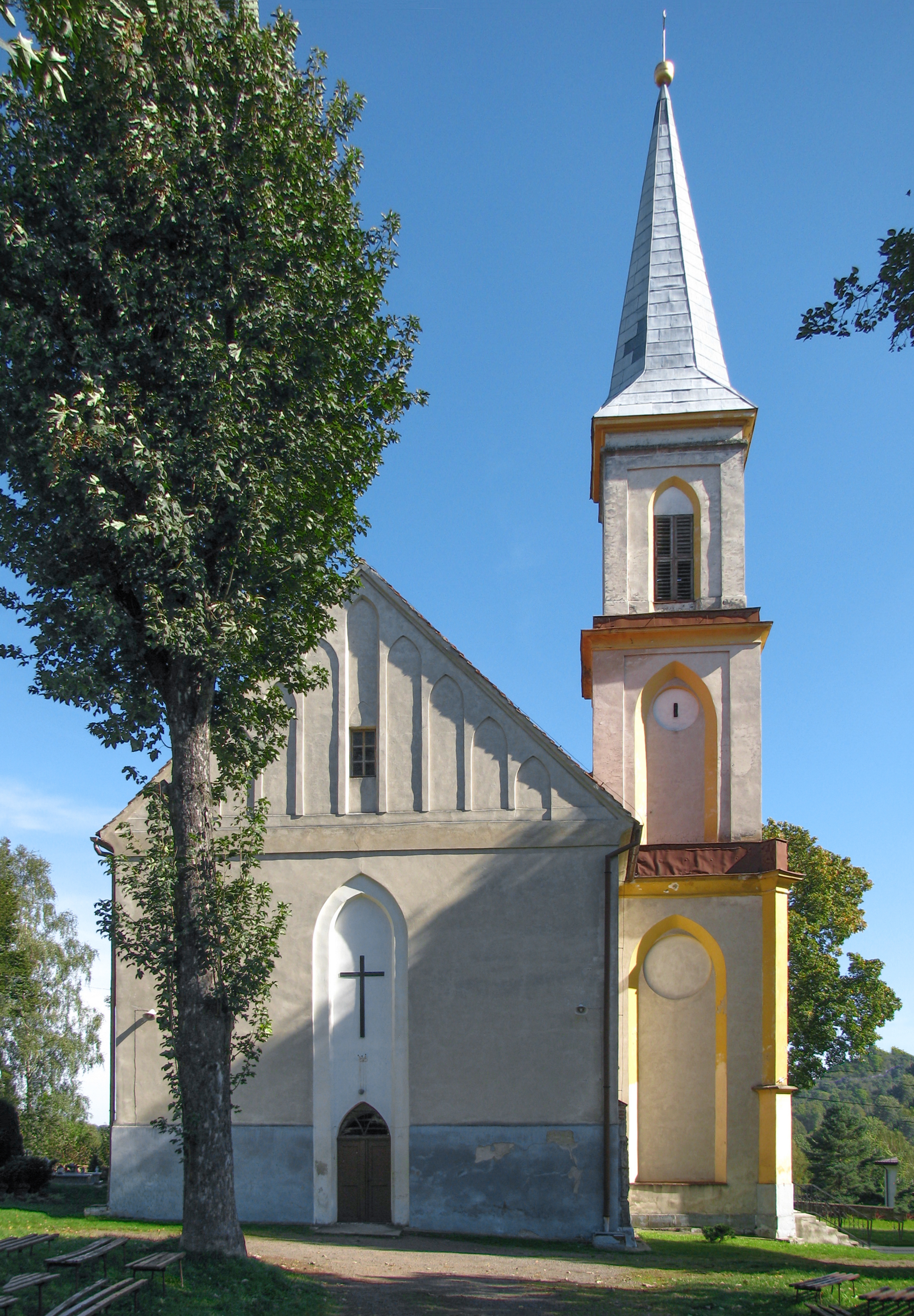
- Church of Saint John the Evangelist

- Location within Poland
- Coordinates: 50°46′12″N 16°21′18″E
- Country: Poland
- Voivodeship: Lower Silesian
- County: Wałbrzych
- Gmina: Walim
- Highest elevation: 440 m (1,440 ft)
- Lowest elevation: 400 m (1,300 ft)

Dziećmorowice [d͡ʑɛt͡ɕmɔrɔˈvit͡sɛ] is a village in the administrative district of Gmina Walim, within Wałbrzych County, Lower Silesian Voivodeship, in south-western Poland.
