= Olszyniec, Lower Silesian Voivodeship =

Olszyniec
- Village
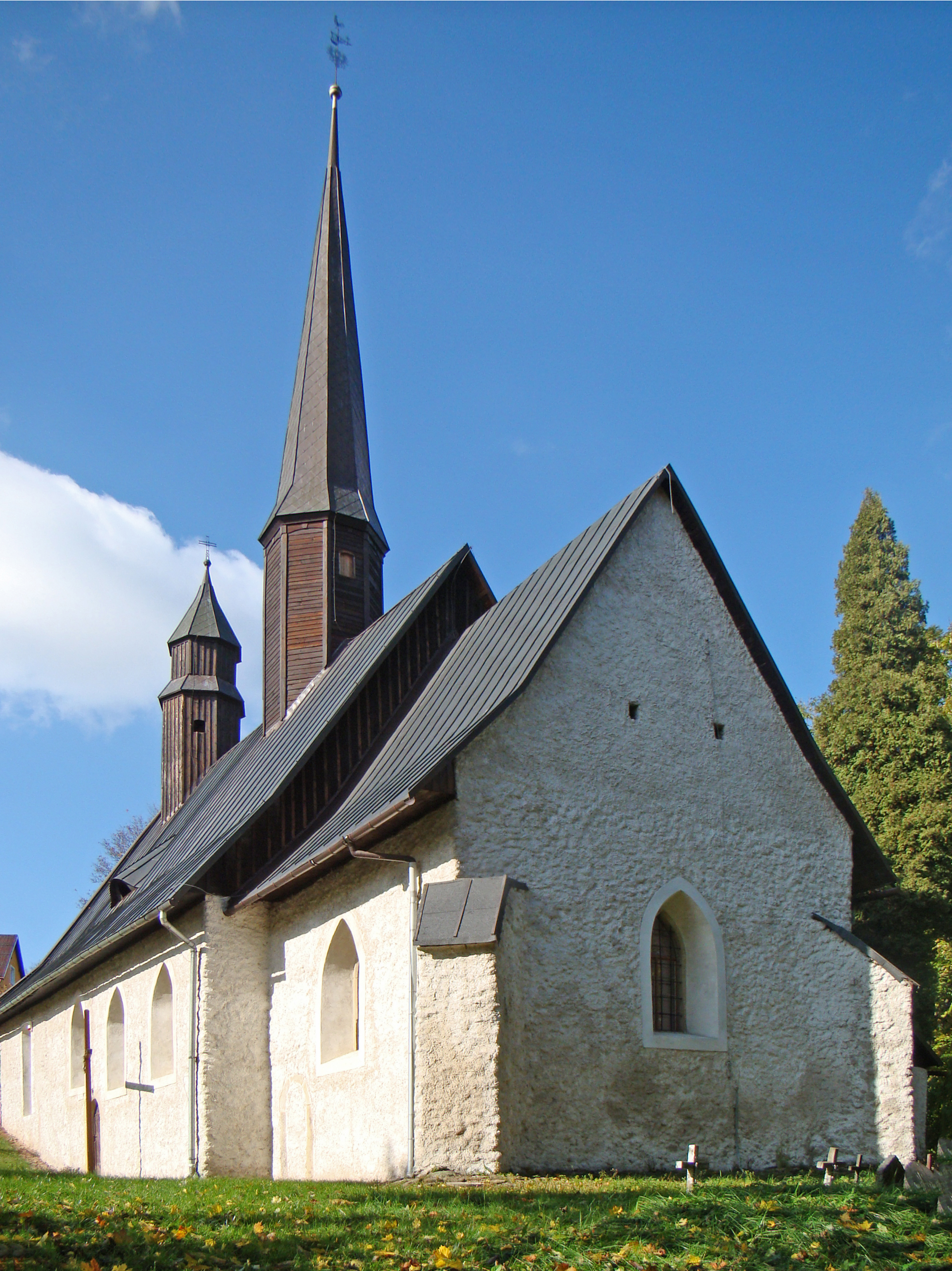
- Saints Joachim and Anna Church

- Location within Poland
- Coordinates: 50°43′36″N 16°23′0″E
- Country: Poland
- Voivodeship: Lower Silesian
- County: Wałbrzych
- Gmina: Walim
- Population (2011): 295
- Time zone: UTC+1 (CET)
  - Summer (DST): UTC+2 (CEST)
- Area code: +48 74
- Vehicle registration: DBA

Olszyniec [ɔlˈʂɨɲɛt͡s] is a village in the administrative district of Gmina Walim, within Wałbrzych County, Lower Silesian Voivodeship, in south-western Poland.

During World War II, Germans established a sub-camp of the Gross-Rosen concentration camp in the village.
