= Rzeczka =

- Village
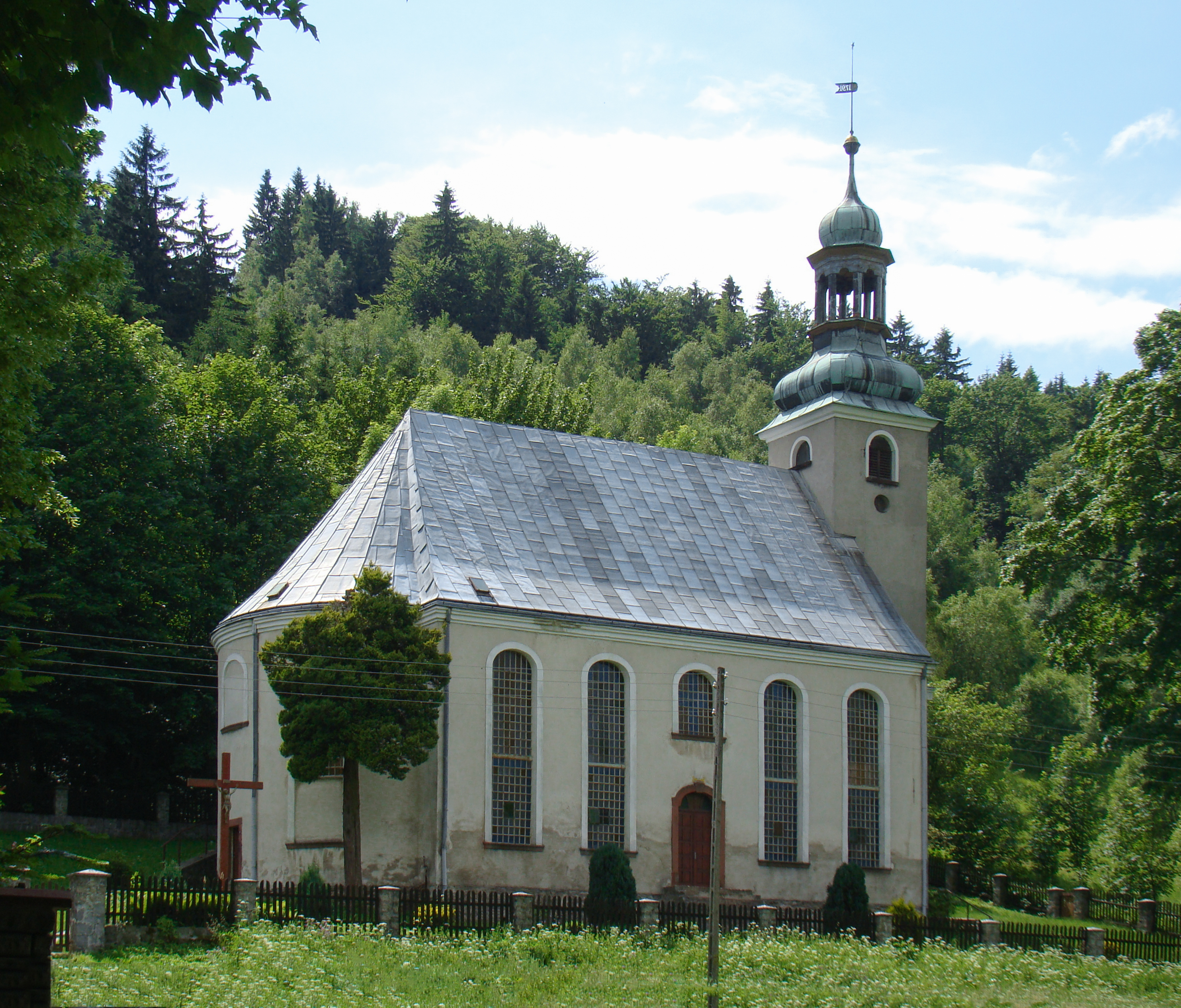
- Maksymilian Kolbe Church

- Location within Poland
- Coordinates: 50°41′N 16°26′E
- Country: Poland
- Voivodeship: Lower Silesian
- County: Wałbrzych
- Gmina: Walim

Rzeczka [ˈʐɛt͡ʂka] is a village in the administrative district of Gmina Walim, within Wałbrzych County, Lower Silesian Voivodeship, in south-western Poland.
