= Jugowice =

- Village
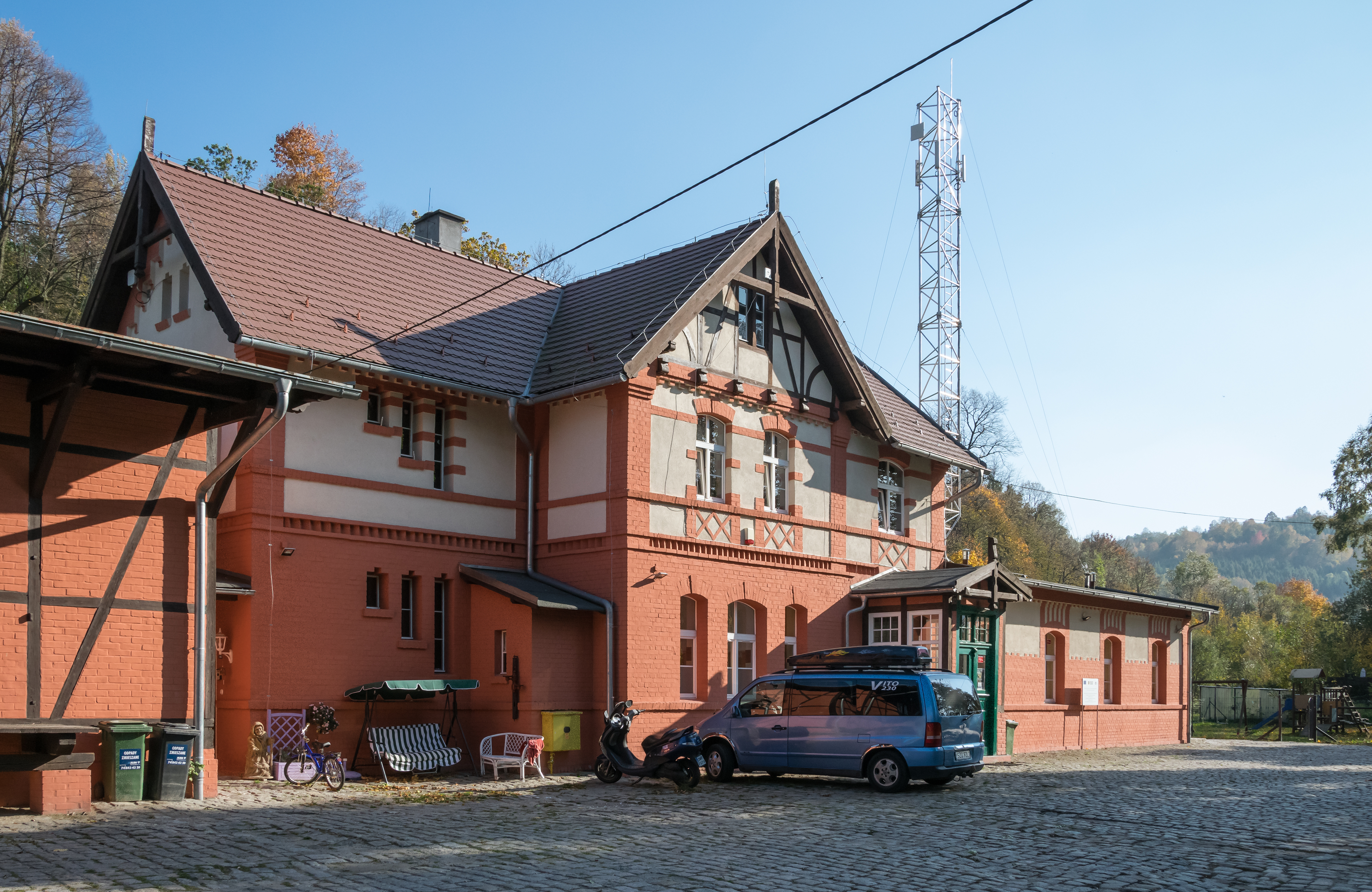
- Former train station, now house of culture

- Location within Poland
- Coordinates: 50°44′12″N 16°24′22″E
- Country: Poland
- Voivodeship: Lower Silesian
- County: Wałbrzych
- Gmina: Walim

Jugowice [juɡɔˈvit͡sɛ] (German: Hausdorf) is a village in the administrative district of Gmina Walim, within Wałbrzych County, Lower Silesian Voivodeship, in south-western Poland.
