= Sophie Brody Award =

Annual award of the American Library Association

The Sophie Brody Award (Sophie Brody Meda) is an annual award of the American Library Association, administered by the Reference and User Services Association RUSA. It is given for outstanding achievement in Jewish literature, for works published the previous year, in the US. It was established in 2006.

The award is named after Sophie Brody and was established by her husband, Arthur Brody, and the Brodart Foundation.

== Honorees ==
Year	Author	Title	Publisher	Result
2006	Avner Mandelman	Talking to the Enemy	Seven Stories Press	Winner
2006	Michael Wex	Born to Kvetch	St. Martin's Press	Honor
2006	Michael Lavigne	Not Me	Random House	Honor
2006	Tom Reiss	The Orientalist: Solving the Mystery of a Strange and Dangerous Life	Random House	Honor
2007	Daniel Mendelsohn	The Lost: A Search for Six of Six Million	HarperCollins	Winner
2007	Sandy Tolan	LemonTree: An Arab, a Jew, and the Heart of the Middle East	Bloomsbury	Honor
2007	Markus Zusak	The Book Thief	Alfred A. Knopf	Honor
2007	Dara Horn	The World to Come	W. W. Norton & Company	Honor
2008	Nathan Englander	The Ministry of Special Cases	Alfred A. Knopf	Winner
2008	Shalom Auslander	Foreskin’s Lament: A Memoir	Riverhead Books	Honor
2008	Diane Ackerman	The Zookeeper's Wife	W. W. Norton & Company	Honor
2008	Joyce Antler	You Never Call! You Never Write! A History of the Jewish Mother	Oxford University Press	Honor
2009	Peter Manseau	Songs for the Butcher's Daughter	Free Press	Winner
2009	Ron Leshem	Beaufort	Delacorte Press	Honor
2009	A.B. Yehoshua	Friendly Fire: A Duet	Mariner Books	Honor
2009	Arie Kaplan	From Krakow to Krypton: Jews and Comic Books	Jewish Publication Society	Honor
2010	Jonathon Keats	The Book of the Unknown: Tales of the Thirty-Six	Random House	Winner
2010	Thomas Buergenthal	A Lucky Child: A Memoir of Surviving Auschwitz as a Young Boy	Little Brown	Honor
2010	Clara Kramer and Stephen Gantz	Clara’s War: One Girl’s Story of Survival	Ecco Press	Honor
2010	Melvin Konner	The Jewish Body	Schocken Books	Honor
2011	Judith Shulevitz	The Sabbath World: Glimpses of a Different Order of Time	Random House	Winner
2011	Eshkol Nevo	Homesick	Dalkey Archive Press	Honor
2012	Adina Hoffman and Peter Cole	Sacred Trash: the Lost and Found World of the Cairo Geniza	Schocken Books	Winner
2012	Simon Sebag Montefiore	Jerusalem: the Biography	Alfred A. Knopf	Honor
2012	Art Spiegelman	MetaMaus	Pantheon Books	Honor
2012	Erika Dreifus	Quiet Americans: Stories	Last Light Studio Books	Honor
2013	Matti Friedman	The Aleppo Codex: A True Story of Obsession, Faith, and the Pursuit of an Ancient Bible	Algonquin Books	Winner
2013	Anouk Markovits	I Am Forbidden	Hogarth Press	Honor
2013	Herman Wouk	The Lawgiver	Simon & Schuster	Honor
2013	Nathan Englander	What We Talk About When We Talk About Anne Frank	Alfred A. Knopf	Honor
2014	Yossi Klein Halevi	Like Dreamers: The Story of the Israeli Paratroopers Who Reunited Jerusalem and Divided a Nation	HarperCollins	Winner
2014	Ari Shavit	My Promised Land: The Triumph and Tragedy of Israel	Spiegel & Grau	Honor
2014	Jeremy Dauber	The Worlds of Sholem Aleichem: The Remarkable Life and Afterlife of the Man Who Created Tevye	Schocken Books	Honor
2015	Boris Fishman	A Replacement Life	HarperCollins	Winner
2015	Ruchama King Feuerman	In the Courtyard of the Kabbalist	The New York Review of Books	Honor
2015	Stuart Rojstaczer	The Mathematician’s Shiva	Penguin	Honor
2016	Jim Shepard	The Book of Aron: A Novel	Alfred A. Knopf	Winner
2016	Michal Lemberger	After Abel and Other Stories	Prospect Park Books	Honor
2016	Dan Ephron	Killing a King: The Assassination of Yitzak Rabin and the Remaking of Israel	W. W. Norton & Company	Honor
2016	Primo Levi	The Complete Works of Primo Levi	Liveright	Honor
2016	Sasha Abramsky	The House of Twenty Thousand Books	The New York Review of Books	Honor
2017	Michael Chabon	Moonglow: A Novel	HarperCollins	Winner
2017	Ezra Glinter	Have I got a Story For You: More than a Century of Fiction from the Forward	W. W. Norton & Company	Honor
2017	Helen Maryles Shankman	In the Land of Armadillos	Charles Scribner's Sons	Honor
2017	Matti Friedman	Pumpkinflowers: A Soldier’s Story	Algonquin Books	Honor
2017	Abraham Karpinowitz	Vilna My Vilna	Syracuse University Press	Honor
2018	Ilana Kurshan	If All the Seas Were Ink: A Memoir	St. Martin’s Press	Winner
2018	Leonardo Padura	Heretics	Farrar, Straus and Giroux	Honor
2018	Bruce Henderson	Sons and Soldiers: The Untold Story of the Jews Who Escaped the Nazis and Returned with the U.S. Army to Fight Hitler	William Morrow	Honor
2019	Michael Lukas	The Last Watchman of Old Cairo	Spiegel & Grau	Winner
2019	Ronen Bergman	Rise and Kill First: The Secret History of Israel’s Targeted Assassinations	Random House	Honor
2019	Jeremy Dronfield	The Stone Crusher: The True Story of a Father and Son’s Fight for Survival in Auschwitz	Chicago Review Press	Honor
2020	Thomas Wolf	The Nightingale’s Sonata: The Musical Odyssey of Lea Luboshutz	Pegasus Books	Winner
2020	Leah Hager Cohen	Strangers and Cousins	Riverhead Books	Honor
2020	Daniel Okrent	The Guarded Gate: Bigotry, Eugenics and the Law That Kept Two Generations of Jews, Italians and Other European Immigrants Out of America	Simon & Schuster	Honor
2020	Alice Hoffman	The World That We Knew	Simon & Schuster	Honor
2021	Yishai Sarid	The Memory Monster	Restless Books	Winner
2021	Hadley Freeman	House of Glass: The Story and Secrets of a Twentieth-Century Jewish Family	Simon & Schuster	Honor
2021	Max Gross	The Lost Shtetl	HarperVia	Honor
2021	A.B Yehoshua	The Tunnel	Houghton Mifflin Harcourt	Honor
2021	Ariana Neumann	When Time Stopped: A Memoir of My Father’s War and What Remains	Scribner	Honor
2022	Jane Yolen	Kaddish Before the Holocaust and After: Poems	Holy Cow Press	Winner
2023	Michael Frank	One Hundred Saturdays: Stella Levi and the Search for a Lost World	Avid Reader Press	Winner
2024	James McBride	The Heaven and Earth Grocery Store	Riverhead	Winner
2025	József Debreczeni	Cold Crematorium	St. Martin’s Press	Winner

== See also ==
- Sophie Brody
