= RUSA awards =

Annual awards for books and media

The Reference and User Services Association (RUSA) is a division of the American Library Association (ALA). In 1972, the Adult Services Division and the Reference Services Division of the ALA were merged into the Reference and Adult Services Division (RASD), which created the RUSA in 1996.

RUSA gives out annual awards to notable books, media, and professional librarians. Awards are selected by RUSA's Collection Development and Evaluation Section (CODES) committees, the Business Reference and Service Section (BRASS), and the History Section (HS).

Book and Media Awards include "Notable Books for Adults", selected by the RUSA Notable Books Council since 1944. The Notable Books Council is in the RUSA CODES Section. RUSA also recognizes outstanding professional achievement in reference librarianship and its many specialties with annual achievement awards at the division level and by each section.

== 2024 awards ==
The association annually recognizes fiction, nonfiction, poetry, audiobook narration, and reference materials. Recipients are selected by committees composed of professionals who specialize in adult services. The sections that give book and media awards are CODES, BRASS, and the History Section.

RUSA also honors librarians with professional achievement awards. Each RUSA section gives awards in its area of specialization.

=== CODES book and media awards ===
These awards are given by the RUSA Collection Development and Evaluation Section (CODES) committees.

==== Andrew Carnegie Medals for Excellence in Fiction and Nonfiction ====
The Andrew Carnegie Medals for Excellence in Fiction and Nonfiction, supported by the Carnegie Corporation of New York, are administered by the American Library Association. The Reference and User Services Association (RUSA) and Booklist cosponsor the awards. Selection is by three former members of the RUSA CODES Notable Books Council and editors from Booklist.

- Fiction: The Berry Pickers: A Novel by Amanda Peters (New York: Catapult).
- Nonfiction: We Were Once a Family: A Story of Love, Death, and Child Removal in America by Roxanna Asgarian (New York: Farrar Straus and Giroux).

==== Notable Books: Fiction ====
- Biography of X by Catherine Lacey (Farrar, Straus and Giroux)
- Chain-Gang All-Stars by Nana Kwame Adjei-Brenyah (Pantheon Books, a division of Penguin Random House LLC)
- Dearborn by Ghassan Zeineddine (Tin House)
- Hangman by Maya Binyam (Farrar, Straus and Giroux)
- In Memoriam by Alice Winn (A Borzoi book published by Alfred A. Knopf, a division of Penguin Random House LLC)
- North Woods by Daniel Mason (Random House, an imprint and division of Penguin Random House LLC)
- Open Throat by Henry Hoke (MCD, a division of Farrar, Straus and Giroux)
- Same Bed Different Dreams by Ed Park (Random House, an imprint and division of Penguin Random House LLC)
- The Heaven and Earth Grocery Store by James McBride (Riverhead Books, an imprint of Penguin Random House LLC)
- The Reformatory by Tananarive Due (Saga Press, an imprint of Simon & Schuster, Inc.)
- Y/N by Esther Yi (Astra House, a division of Astra Publishing House)

==== Notable Books: Nonfiction ====
- A Fever in the Heartland: The Ku Klux Klan's Plot to Take Over America, and the Woman Who Stopped Them by Timothy Egan (Viking, an imprint of Penguin Random House LLC)
- Dyscalculia: A Love Story of Epic Miscalculation by Camonghne Felix (One World, an imprint of Random House, a division of Penguin Random House LLC)
- How to Say Babylon: A Memoir by Safiya Sinclair (37 Ink, an imprint of Simon & Schuster Inc.)
- King: A Life by Jonathan Eig (Farrar, Straus and Giroux)
- Master, Slave, Husband, Wife: An Epic Journey from Slavery to Freedom by Ilyon Woo (Simon and Schuster)
- Mott Street: A Chinese American Family's Story of Exclusion and Homecoming by Ava Chin (Penguin Press, an imprint of Penguin Random House LLC)
- Our Migrant Souls: A Meditation on Race and the Meanings and Myths of 'Latino' by Héctor Tobar (MCD, a division of Farrar, Straus and Giroux)
- Poverty, by America by Matthew Desmond (Crown, an imprint of Random House, a division of Penguin Random House LLC)
- The Exceptions: Nancy Hopkins, MIT, and the Fight for Women in Science by Kate Zernike (Scribner, an imprint of Simon & Schuster, Inc.)
- The Great Displacement: Climate Change and the Next American Migration by Jake Bittle (Simon & Schuster)
- The Talk by Darrin Bell (Henry Holt and Company)
- The Wager: A Tale of Shipwreck, Mutiny, and Murder by David Grann (Doubleday, a division of Penguin Random House LLC)

==== Notable Books: Poetry ====
- Promises of Gold / Promesas de Oro by José Olivarez (Henry Holt and Company)
- Side Notes from the Archivist by Anastacia-Renee (Amistad, an imprint of HarperCollins Publishers)
- Trace Evidence by Charif Shanahan (Tin House)

==== Sophie Brody Award ====
The Sophie Brody Medal is an annual award of the Reference and User Services Association (RUSA). It is given for outstanding achievement in Jewish literature for works published the previous year in the US. The award is named after Sophie Brody and was established by her husband, Arthur Brody, and the Brodart Foundation.

- The Heaven and Earth Grocery Store by James McBride (Riverhead, an imprint of Penguin Random House)

==== The Reading List ====
The Reading List is a RUSA CODES committee that compiles an annual list of the best genre books for the adult reader.

- Adrenaline: Better the Blood: A Hana Westerman Thriller by Michael Bennett (Atlantic Monthly Press, an imprint of Grove Atlantic)
- Fantasy: Gods of the Wyrdwood: The Forsaken Trilogy, Book One by R. J. Barker (Orbit, an imprint of Hachette Book Group)
- Historical fiction: Lady Tan's Circle of Women: A Novel by Lisa See (Scribner, an imprint of Simon & Schuster, Inc.)
- Horror: The September House by Carissa Orlando (Berkley, an imprint of Penguin Random House LLC)
- Mystery: A Disappearance in Fiji by Nilima Rao (Soho Press, Inc.)
- Relationship Fiction: The Mostly True Story of Tanner & Louise by Colleen Oakley (Berkley, an imprint of Penguin Random House LLC)
- Romance: Role Playing by Cathy Yardley (Montlake, an imprint of Amazon Publishing)
- Science fiction: House of Gold by C. T. Rwizi (47 North, an imprint of Amazon Publishing)

==== The Listen List ====
The Listen List Council of the Collection Development and Evaluation Section (CODES) of the Reference and User Services Association (RUSA) includes fiction and nonfiction and features voices that enthrall, delight, and inspire.

- The Adventures of Amina al-Sirafi by Shannon Chakraborty. Narrated by Lameece Issaq and Amin El Gamal. HarperAudio.
- Chain-Gang All-Stars by Nana Kwame Adjei-Brenyah. Narrated by Shayna Small, Aaron Goodson, Michael Crouch, and Lee Osorio. Books on Tape.
- Con/Artist: The Life and Crimes of the World's Greatest Art Forger by Tony Tetro and Giampiero Ambrosi. Narrated by Richard Ferrone, Tony Tetro, and Giampiero Ambrosi. Hachette Audio.
- Fractal Noise by Christopher Paolini. Narrated by Jennifer Hale. Macmillan Audio.
- Happiness Falls by Angie Kim. Narrated by Shannon Tyo, Sean Patrick Hopkins, and Thomas Pruyn. Books on Tape.
- The Heaven & Earth Grocery Store by James McBride. Narrated by Dominic Hoffman. Books on Tape.
- Infinity Gate by M. R. Carey. Narrated by Dami Olukoya. Hachette Audio.
- King: A Life by Jonathan Eig. Narrated by Dion Graham. Macmillan Audio.
- The Laughter by Sonora Jha. Narrated by Christopher Grove and Deepti Gupta. HarperAudio.
- The Love You Save by Goldie Taylor. Narrated by Bahni Turpin. Harlequin Audio.
- Vera Wong's Unsolicited Advice for Murders by Jesse Q. Sutanto. Narrated by Eunice Wong. Books on Tape.

==== Essential Cookbooks 2024 ====
Essential Cookbooks highlights titles for both avid home chefs and those just learning the rewards of making a meal.

- Baking Yesteryear: The Best Recipes from the 1900s to the 1980s by B. Dylan Hollis. DK.
- The Cook's Book: Recipes for Keeps & Essential Techniques to Master Everyday Cooking by Bri McKoy. Revell.
- Every Season is Soup Season: 85+ Souper-Adaptable Recipes to Batch, Share, Reinvent, and Enjoy by Shelly Westerhausen Worcel with Wyatt Worcel. Chronicle Books.
- The Global Pantry Cookbook: Transform Your Everyday Cooking with Tahini, Gochujang, Miso, and Other Irresistible Ingredients by Ann Taylor Pittman and Scott Mowbrary. Workman.
- Juke Joints, Jazz Clubs & Juice: Cocktails from Two Centuries of African American Cookbooks by Toni Tipton-Martin. Clarkson Potter.
- Latinísimo: Home Recipes from the Twenty-One Countries of Latin America by Sandra A. Gutierrez. Alfred A. Knopf.
- Shabbat: Recipes and Rituals from My Table to Yours by Adeena Sussman. Avery.
- Signature Cocktails by Amanda Schuster. Phaidon Press.
- Tenderheart: A Cookbook About Vegetables and Unbreakable Family Bonds by Hetty Lui McKinnon. Alfred A. Knopf.
- Veg-table: Recipes, Techniques, and Plant Science for Big-Flavored, Vegetable-Focused Meals by Nik Sharma. Chronicle Books.
- A Very Chinese Cookbook: 100 Recipes from China and Not China (But Still Really Chinese) by Kevin Pang and Jeffrey Pang. America's Test Kitchen.

==== Outstanding Reference Sources ====
The Outstanding Reference Sources Committee was established in 1958 to recommend the most outstanding reference publications published the previous year for small and medium-sized public and academic libraries. The selected titles are valuable reference resources and are highly recommended for inclusion in any library's reference collections.

- African American Activism and Political Engagement: An Encyclopedia of Empowerment edited by Angela Jones. Bloomsbury Publishing.
- The Encyclopedia of LGBTQIA+ Portrayals in American Film edited by Erica Joan Dymond and Salvador Jiménez Murguía.
- Executive Speech Doctor: Engaging with Community Audiences in Person and Online by Robert J. Weis. McFarland.
- Forgotten African American Firsts: An Encyclopedia of Pioneering History by Hans Ostrom and J. David Macey Jr. Greenwood.
- Global Dishes: Favorite Meals from around the World by Caryn E. Neumann, Lori L. Parks, and Joel G. Parks. Bloomsbury Academic.
- Latino Literature: An Encyclopedia for Students edited by Christina Soto van der Plas and Lacie Rae Buckwalter Cunningham.
- Martin Luther King Jr.: A Reference Guide to His Life and Works (Significant Figures in World History) by Peter J. Ling and David Deverick. Rowman & Littlefield.
- The New International Volunteer: A Hands-On Guide to Sustainable and Inclusive Development by Elizabeth C. Medlin. Toplight Books.
- The Scopes Trial: An Encyclopedic History by Randy Moore and Susan E. Brooks. McFarland.
- Women in Popular Culture: The Evolution of Women's Roles in American Entertainment by Laura L. Finley. Greenwood.

==== Dartmouth Medal ====
The Dartmouth Medal of the American Library Association is awarded annually to a reference work of outstanding quality and significance published during the previous calendar year.

- Hymenoptera: The Natural History & Diversity of Wasps, Bees & Ants by Stephen A. Marshall. Firefly Books.

=== BRASS outstanding business information sources ===
The Business Reference and Services Section (BRASS) focuses on all aspects of business reference. BRASS publications are Academic BRASS, a biannual newsletter produced by the Business Reference in Academic Libraries Committee; Public Libraries Briefcase, a quarterly column produced by the Business Reference in Public Libraries Committee; and BRASS Notes, a quarterly column devoted to news about current BRASS activities. Each year BRASS awards "Outstanding Business Reference Sources" and "Best of the Best Business Web Resources".

==== Outstanding business information sources ====
Each year, the Business Information Sources Committee of the Business Reference and Services Section (BRASS) selects the outstanding business information sources published since May of the previous year.

===== Outstanding =====
- Chip War: The Fight for the World's Most Critical Technology by Chris Miller. New York, NY: Scribner, an Imprint of Simon & Schuster, 2022.
- Routledge Handbook of the Extractive Industries and Sustainable Development edited by Natalia Yakovleva and Edmund Nickless. New York, NY: Routledge, 2022.

===== Notable =====
- Entrepreneurship in the Creative Industries: How Innovative Agents Skills and Networks Interact by Phillip McIntyre, Janet Fulton, Susan Kerrigan, and Michael Meany. Cham, CH: Palgrave Macmillan, 2023.
- Handbook of Research on Artificial Intelligence in Human Resource Management edited by Stefan Strohmeier. Cheltenham, UK: Edward Elgar Publishing, 2022.
- Power and Prediction: The Disruptive Economics of Artificial Intelligence by Jay Agrawal, Joshua Gans, and Avi Goldfarb. Boston, MA: Harvard Business Review Press, 2022.

==== Best of the Best Business Web Resources ====
The BRASS "Best of the Best Business Web Resources Award" debuted in 2009. Awards recognize four web-based resources that are highly relevant to information professionals involved in providing business reference services. Selected by members of the BRASS Education Committee.

2024:

- Collective Bargaining, Labor Relations, and Labor Unions Guide. Published by Martin P. Catherwood Library, Cornell University Library.
- Data is Plural. Published by Jeremy Singer-Vine.
- LexMundi Country Guides. Published by Lex Mundi.

2023:

- The Business Model Canvas.
- Ethics Unwrapped – Launched in 2013, maintained by the McCombs School of Business at the University of Texas at Austin.
- Harvard's Atlas of Economic Complexity (version 3, 2021) – This annually updated atlas is part of The Growth Lab at Harvard University.
- Tax Notes' Tax History Project. Tax Analysts, a nonprofit tax publisher, established the Tax History Project in 1995.

=== History Section: Historical materials ===
The History Section represents the subject interests of reference librarians, archivists, bibliographers, genealogists, historians, and others engaged in historical reference or research. It brings together representatives of history collections in all formats from all types of libraries, archives, and historical societies. It was established in 1961.

The RUSA HS Historical Materials Committee annually compiles and publishes the Best Historical Materials list with extensive annotation at the RUSA HS website.

- Election Atlas of India: Parliamentary Elections 1952–2019: 1st Lok Sabha to 17th Lok Sabha: updated till January 2022. Edited by R. K. Thukrai. New Delhi: Datanet India Pvt. Ltd., 2022.
- Enemy Archives: Soviet Counterinsurgency Operations and the Ukrainian Nationalist Movement – Selections from the Secret Police Archives. Edited by Volodymyr Viatrovych and Lubomyr Luciuk. Translated by Marta Daria Olynyk. Montreal: McGill-Queen's University Press, 2023.
- Historical Dictionary of Modern Coups d'État. By John J. Chin, Joseph Wright, and David B. Carter. Lanham, Maryland: Rowman & Littlefield, 2022.
- Invitation to Syriac Christianity: An Anthology. Edited by Michael Philip Penn, Scott Fitzgerald Johnson, Christine Shepardson, and Charles M. Stang. Berkeley: University of California Press, 2022.
- The Mexican Revolution: A Documentary History. Edited by Jürgen Buchenau and Timothy J. Henderson. Indianapolis: Hackett Publishing, 2022.
- The Oxford Handbook of Global Drug History. Edited by Paul Gootenberg. New York: Oxford University Press, 2022.
- The Portable Anna Julia Cooper. Edited by Shirley Moody-Turner. New York: Penguin Books, 2022.
- Qing Imperial Illustrations of Tributary Peoples: A Cultural Cartography of Empire. Edited and translated by Laura Hostetler and Xuemei Wu. Boston: Brill, 2022.
- The Routledge Handbook of Public Taxation in Medieval Europe. Edited by Denis Menjot, Mathieu Caesar, Florent Garnier, and Pere Verdés Pijuan. New York: Routledge, 2023.
- Salish and Kootenai Indian Chiefs Speak for Their People and Land, 1865–1909. Edited by Robert Bigart and Joseph McDonald. Pablo, Montana: Salish Kootenai College Press, 2023.
- The Travels of Richard Traunter: Two Journeys through the Native Southeast in 1698 and 1699. Edited by Sandra L. Dahlberg. Charlottesville: University of Virginia Press, 2022.
- Writing Gaia: The Scientific Correspondence of James Lovelock and Lynn Margulis. Edited by Bruce Clarke and Sébastien Dutreuil. New York: Cambridge University Press, 2022.

=== RUSA achievement awards ===
The Reference and User Services Association represents librarians and library staff in the fields of reference, specialized reference, collection development, readers' advisory, and resource sharing.

RUSA's Achievement Awards Program honors the best in reference librarianship and its many specialties.

==== Division level ====
- Isadore Gilbert Mudge Award to an individual who has made a distinguished contribution to reference librarianship: Meg Smith, New York University Division of Libraries.
- Gail Schlachter Memorial Research Grant: Dr. Renate Chancellor and Shannon Crooks for the project, "Investigating Social Work in Public Libraries".
- RUSA Award for Excellence in Reference and Adult Library Services: Addison Public Library, Addison, Illinois.
- Federal Achievement Award honors individuals for achievement in the promotion of library and information service and the information profession in the federal community.
  - Paula Laurita, Command Librarian at the United States Army Materiel Command Redstone Arsenal in Huntsville, Alabama.
  - D. Lynne Rickard, Records Specialist at the Pension Benefit Guaranty Corporation (PBGC) in Washington, D.C.
- Federal Rising Stars:
  - Elán Marae Birkeland, Library Program Director, Headquarters, U.S. Marine Corps in Quantico, VA;
  - Max Gonzalez Burdick, Library Branch Manager, Shadow Mountain Branch Library, Marine Corps Air Ground Combat Center Twentynine Palms;
  - Lori Ann Mullooly, Librarian at the U.S. Military Academy in West Point, NY.

==== Business Reference and Services Section (BRASS) ====
- Academic Business Librarianship Travel Award: Henry Huang, New York University, Shanghai Library.
- Excellence in Business Librarianship Award: Diane Zabel, Head of Schreyer Business Library, The Pennsylvania State University.
- Public Librarian Support Award: Morgan Perry, Mid-Continent Public Library, Independence, Missouri.
- Research Grant Award: Georgette Nicolosi, Missouri University of Science & Technology.
- Student Travel Award: Brandyn Whitaker.

==== Collection Development and Evaluation Section (CODES) ====
- Louis Shores Award: Marlene Harris and LibraryReads.

==== Emerging Technologies Section (ETS) ====
- ETS Achievement Award.
- ETS Best Emerging Technology Application Award:
  - Cyril Oberlander, Library Dean and Project Sponsor, Aj Bealum, Programmer & Project Manager, and Team Flora, of California State Polytechnic University, Humboldt Library, for 3D Digital Herbarium.
  - Jennifer Shipley, Library Operations Manager, Miami-Dade Public Library System for Multi-sensory POP-UP Storywalk™.

==== History Section (HS) ====
- History Research and Innovation Award.
- HS Genealogy/History Achievement Award: D. Brenton Simons, President Emeritus and Chief Stewardship Officer, American Ancestors.

==== Sharing and Transforming Access to Resources Section (STARS) ====
- STARS Mentoring Award: Amanda Scott, Texas State University.
- STARS Publication Recognition Award: Brynne Norton, University of Maryland Libraries.
- Virginia Boucher Distinguished ILL Librarian Award: Emily Campbell, Director of Document Delivery, University of Michigan – Ann Arbor.

== 2023 awards ==
=== CODES book and media awards ===
These awards are given by the RUSA Collection Development and Evaluation Section (CODES) committees.

==== Andrew Carnegie Medals for Excellence in Fiction and Nonfiction ====
- Fiction: The Swimmers by Julie Otsuka (Alfred A. Knopf, a division of Penguin Random House LLC).
- Nonfiction: An Immense World: How Animal Senses Reveal the Hidden Realms Around Us by Ed Yong (Random House, a division of Penguin Random House LLC).

==== Dartmouth Medal ====
- The World Atlas of Trees and Forests: Exploring Earth's Forest Ecosystems by Herman Shugart, Peter White, Sassan Saatchi, and Jérôme Chave (Princeton University Press).

==== Notable Books: Fiction ====
- Seeking Fortune Elsewhere by Sindya Bhanoo (Catapult)
- Horse by Geraldine Brooks (Viking, an imprint of Penguin Random House, LLC)
- Trust by Hernan Diaz (Riverhead Books, an imprint of Penguin Random House LLC)
- Stories From The Tenants Downstairs by Sidik Fofana (Scribner, an imprint of Simon & Schuster, Inc.)
- The Rabbit Hutch by Tess Gunty (Alfred A. Knopf, a division of Penguin Random House, LLC)
- The Haunting of Hajji Hotak and Other Stories by Jamil Jan Kochai (Viking, an imprint of Penguin Random House LLC)
- What We Fed to the Manticore by Talia Lakshmi Kolluri (Tin House)
- Vagabonds by Eloghosa Osunde (Riverhead Books, an imprint of Penguin Random House LLC)
- The Swimmers by Julie Otsuka (Alfred A. Knopf, a division of Penguin Random House LLC)
- Elsewhere by Alexis Schaitkin (Celadon books, a division of Macmillan Publishers)
- The Furrows by Namwali Serpell (Hogarth, an imprint of Random House Publishing Group, a division of Penguin Random House LLC)

==== Notable Books: Nonfiction ====
- Also A Poet: Frank O'Hara, My Father, And Me by Ada Calhoun (Grove Press, an imprint of Grove Atlantic)
- The Vortex: A True Story of History's Deadliest Storm, An Unspeakable War and Liberation by Scott Carney and Jason Miklian (Ecco, an imprint of HarperCollins Publishers)
- Bitch: On the Female of the Species by Lucy Cooke (Basic Books, an imprint of Perseus Books, LLC, a subsidiary of Hachette Book Group)
- The Escape Artist: The Man Who Broke Out of Auschwitz to Warn the World by Jonathan Freedland (Harper, an imprint of HarperCollins Publishers)
- This Body I Wore: A Memoir by Diana Goetsch (Farrar, Straus and Giroux)
- We Are the Middle of Forever: Indigenous Voices from Turtle Island on the Changing Earth by Dahr Jamail and Stan Rushworth (The New Press)
- Easy Beauty by Chloe Cooper Jones (Avid Reader Press, an imprint of Simon & Schuster, Inc.)
- The Song of the Cell: An Exploration of Medicine and the New Human by Siddhartha Mukherjee (Scribner, an imprint of Simon & Schuster, Inc.)
- His Name Is George Floyd: One Man's Life And The Struggle For Racial Justice by Robert Samuels and Toluse Olorunnipa (Viking, an imprint of Penguin Random House LLC)
- Under The Skin: The Hidden Toll of Racism on American Lives and the Health of Our Nation by Linda Villarosa (Doubleday, a division of Penguin Random House, LLC)
- An Immense World: How Animal Senses Reveal the Hidden Realms Around Us by Ed Yong (Random House, an imprint and division of Penguin Random House LLC)

==== Notable Books: Poetry ====
- Your Emergency Contact Has Experienced an Emergency by Chen Chen (BOA Editions, Ltd.)
- Alive At the End Of the World by Saeed Jones (Coffee House Press)
- Bless the Daughter Raised by A Voice in Her Head by Warson Shire (Random House, an imprint and division of Penguin Random House LLC)
- The Rupture Tense by Jenny Xie (Graywolf Press)

==== Sophie Brody Medal ====
- One Hundred Saturdays: Stella Levi and the Search for a Lost World by Michael Frank. Art by Maira Kalman (Avid Reader Press, a division of Simon & Schuster).

==== The Reading List ====
- Adrenaline: Killers of a Certain Age by Deanna Raybourn (Berkley, an imprint of Penguin Random House LLC)
- Fantasy: Nettle & Bone by T. Kingfisher (A Tor Book, published by Tom Doherty Associates)
- Historical fiction: By Her Own Design: A Novel of Ann Lowe, Fashion Designer to the Social Register by Piper Huguley (William Morrow, an imprint of HarperCollins Publishers)
- Horror: Nothing But Blackened Teeth by Cassandra Khaw (A Nightfire Book, published by Tom Doherty Associates)
- Mystery: Arsenic and Adobo by Mia P. Manansala (Berkley Prime Crime, published by Berkley, an imprint of Penguin Random House LLC)
- Relationship fiction: The Guncle: A Novel by Steven Rowley (G. P. Putnam's Sons, an imprint of Penguin Random House LLC
- Romance: One Last Stop by Casey McQuiston (St. Martin's Griffin, an imprint of St. Martin's Publishing Group)
- Science fiction: A Psalm for the Wild-Built by Becky Chambers (A Tordotcom Book, published by Tom Doherty Associates).

==== The Listen List ====
- The Angel of Rome: And Other Stories by Jess Walter. Narrated by Edoardo Ballerini and Julia Whelan. HarperAudio.
- The Bangalore Detectives Club by Harini Nagendra. Narrated by Soneela Nankani. Blackstone Publishing.
- Book Lovers by Emily Henry. Narrated by Julia Whelan. Books on Tape.
- The Diamond Eye by Kate Quinn. Narrated by Saskia Maarleveld. HarperAudio.
- An Immense World: How Animal Senses Reveal the Hidden Realms Around Us by Ed Yong. Narrated by Ed Yong. Books on Tape.
- Iona Iverson's Rules for Commuting by Clare Pooley. Narrated by Clare Corbett. Books on Tape.
- A Lady's Guide to Fortune-Hunting by Sophie Irwin. Narrated by Eleanor Tomlinson. Books on Tape.
- The Patron Saint of Second Chances by Christine Simon. Narrated by Tim Francis. Simon & Schuster Audio.
- Playing with Myself by Randy Rainbow. Narrated by Randy Rainbow. Macmillan Audio.
- River of the Gods: Genius, Courage, and Betrayal in the Search for the Source of the Nile by Candice Millard. Narrated by Paul Michael. Books on Tape.
- Stories from the Tenants Downstairs by Sidik Fofana. Narrated by Joniece Abbott-Pratt, Nile Bullock, Sidik Fofana, Dominic Hoffman, DePre Owens, André Santana, Bahni Turpin, and Jade Wheeler. Simon & Schuster Audio.
- Take My Hand by Dolen Perkins-Valdez. Narrated by Lauren J. Daggett. Books on Tape.
- Unlikely Animals by Annie Hartnett. Narrated by Mark Bramhall and Kirby Heyborne. Books on Tape.

==== 2022 Essential Cookbooks ====
"These wonderful books highlight titles for both avid home chefs and those just learning the rewards of making a meal. The list further supports those who appreciate the many joys of reading cookbooks, even if they rarely venture into the kitchen. As judged by librarians who cooked from, enjoyed, and discussed them, these cookbooks expand and enrich collections and offer cooks multiple ways to make delicious meals. They will become reliable favorites and nourish readers, today and for years to come."

- Cook this Book: Techniques That Teach and Recipes to Repeat by Molly Baz. Clarkson Potter.
- New Native Kitchen: Celebrating Modern Recipes of the American Indian by Chef Freddie Bitsoie & James O. Fraioli. Abrams.
- Vegetarian Chinese Soul Food: Deliciously Doable Ways to Cook Greens, Tofu, and Other Plant-Based Ingredients by Hsiao-Ching Chou. Sasquatch Books.
- Zoë Bakes Cakes: Everything You Need to Know to Make Your Favorite Layers, Bundts, Loaves, and More [A Baking Book] by Zoë François. Ten Speed Press.
- Baking with Dorie: Sweet, Salty & Simple by Dorie Greenspan. Houghton Mifflin Harcourt.
- Milk Street Tuesday: Nights Mediterranean: 125 Simple Weeknight Recipes from the World's Healthiest Cuisine by Christopher Kimball.
- Grains for Every Season: Rethinking Our Way with Grains by Joshua McFadden with Martha Holmberg. Artisan.
- Bress 'n' Nyam: Gullah Geechee Recipes from a Sixth Generation Farmer by Matthew Raiford with Amy Paige Condon. The Countryman Press.
- Cook Real Hawai'i: A Cookbook by Sheldon Simeon. Clarkson Potter.
- Simply Julia: 110 Easy Recipes for Healthy Comfort Food by Julia Turshen. Harper Wave.
- Flavors of the Sun: The Sahadi's Guide to Understanding, Buying and Using Middle Eastern Ingredients by Christine Sahadi Whelan. Chronicle Books.

==== Outstanding reference sources ====
- Free Speech and Censorship: a Documentary and Reference Guide by Cari Lee Skogberg Eastman. Greenwood An Imprint of ABC-Clio, LLC.
- Oxford Encyclopedia of the History of American Foreign Relations by Mark Atwood Lawrence (Editor in Chief), Michael R. Anderson (Associate Editor). Oxford University Press.
- Chocolate: a cultural encyclopedia by Ross F. Collins. ABC-Clio An Imprint of ABC-Clio, LLC.
- Exercise and Physical Activity: From Health Benefits to Fitness Crazes by R.K. Devlin (Editor). Greenwood An Imprint of ABC-Clio, LLC.
- Handbook of Dynamics and Probability by Peter Müller. Springer.
- Nitrate Handbook: Environmental, Agricultural, and Health Effects by Christos Tsadilas (Editor). CRC Press is an imprint of Taylor & Francis Group, LLC.
- Annelida by Greg Rouse, Fredrik Pleijel, and Ekin Tilic. Oxford University Press.
- Insectpedia: A Brief Compendium of Insect Lore by Eric R. Eaton. Princeton University Press.
- Bob Dylan: A Descriptive, Critical Discography and Filmography, 1961–2022, 3rd edition by John Nogowski. McFarland & Company.
- Vaccination: Examining the Facts by Lisa Rosner. ABC-Clio An Imprint of ABC-Clio, LLC.

=== BRASS Best of the Best Business Web Resources awards ===
The 2023 Awards recognize four web-based resources that are highly relevant to information professionals involved in providing business reference services. Selected by members of the 2022/23 BRASS Education Committee.

- The Business Model Canvas. Strategyzer.com
- Ethics Unwrapped. McCombs School of Business at the University of Texas at Austin.
- Harvard's Atlas of Economic Complexity. The Growth Lab at Harvard University.
- Tax Notes' Tax History Project. Tax Analysts.

=== History Section: Historical materials ===
- African Voices from the Inquisition, Vol. 1: The Trial of Crispina Peres of Cacheu, Guinea-Bissau (1646–1668). Edited and translated by Toby Green, Philip Havik, and F. Ribeiro da Silva. Oxford: British Academy, Oxford University Press, 2021.
- Codex Sierra: A Nahuatl-Mixtec Book of Accounts from Colonial Mexico. Written by Kevin Terraciano. Norman: University of Oklahoma Press, 2021.
- A Companion to American Agricultural History. Edited by R. Douglas Hurt. (Wiley Blackwell Companions to American History.) Hoboken, NJ: John Wiley & Sons, 2022.
- Fighting Hunger, Dealing with Shortage: Everyday Life Under Occupation in World War II Europe: A Source Edition. Edited by Tatjana Tönsmeyer, Peter Haslinger, Włodzimierz Borodziej, Stefan Martens, and Irina Sherbakova. Boston: Brill, 2021.
- Global Press Archive. East View Information Services. This massive archive currently offers over 30 million digitized full-image newspaper pages from 1,600 newspapers covering the 18th century to the present.
- Mifflin, Werner. Writings of Warner Mifflin: Forgotten Quaker Abolitionist of the Revolutionary Era. Edited by Gary B. Nash and Michael R. McDowell. Newark: University of Delaware Press, 2021.
- Muslim Sources of the Crusader Period: An Anthology. Edited and translated, with an introduction, by James E. Lindsay and Suleiman A. Mourad. Indianapolis/Cambridge: Hackett Publishing Company, 2021.
- The Persecution and Murder of the European Jews by Nazi Germany, 1933–1945. Boston: De Gruyter Oldenbourg, 2019–present. 16 vols.
- The Rise of the Mongols: Five Chinese Sources. Edited and translated by Christopher P. Atwood, with Lynn Struve. Indianapolis, IN: Hackett Publishing Co., 2021.
- Seen/Unseen: Hidden Lives in a Community of Enslaved Georgians. Written and edited by Christopher R. Lawton, Laura E. Nelson, and Randy L. Reid. Athens, GA: The University of Georgia Press, 2021.
- To Address You as My Friend: African Americans' Letters to Abraham Lincoln. Edited by Jonathan W. White. Chapel Hill, NC: The University of North Carolina Press, 2021.
- Wartime North Africa: A Documentary History, 1934–1950. Edited by Sarah Abrevaya Stein and Aomar Boum. Stanford, CA: Stanford University Press, 2022.

=== RUSA achievement awards ===
==== Division level ====
- Isadore Gilbert Mudge Award to an individual who has made a distinguished contribution to reference librarianship: Jennifer C. Boettcher, Business Librarian at Georgetown University.
- John Sessions Memorial Award recognizes a library or library system which has made a significant effort to work with the labor community: Princeton University Industrial Relations Library.
- RUSA Award for Excellence in Reference and Adult Library Services: Rebecca Clarke, Manager, Adult Services at St. Louis County Library.
- Gail Schlachter Memorial Research Grant: Christina Plakas, PhD student of Criminology and Criminal Justice at the University of South Carolina – Columbia.
- Exceptional Service Award to patients, home bound, people in group homes, inmates: Willetta M. Grady, Librarian/Library Media Specialist, Trousdale Turner Correctional Center in Hartsville TN.
- Federal Achievement Award: Michelle A. Ortiz, Supervisory Librarian, Vicenza and Del Din Library, USAG Italy, ARMY-IMCOM.
- Federal Rising Stars Award: Mariah Antoinette Lovick, Thomas Lee Hall Library.
- Francis Joseph Campbell Award: No award.
- Keystone Library Automation System (KLAS) & National Organization on Disability (NOD) Award: No award.
- Stephen T. Riedner Grant for Life Enhancing Library Programs for People Living with Dementia: East Chicago Public Library, IN and Roddenbery Memorial Library in Cairo, Georgia.

==== Business Reference and Services Section (BRASS) ====
- Excellence in Business Librarianship: Hal P. Kirkwood, Bodeian Business Librarian, University of Oxford.

==== Collection Development and Evaluation Section (CODES) ====
- Louis Shores Award recognizes an individual reviewer, group, editor, review medium, or organization for excellence in book reviewing and other media for libraries: Diana Tixier Herald, Genreflecting series and Fluent in Fantasy and Strictly Science Fiction.

==== Emerging Technologies Section (ETS) ====
- ETS Achievement Award: Shannon Jones, Director of Libraries, Medical University of South Carolina & Director, Region 2, Network of the National Library of Medicine.

==== History Section (HS) ====
- History Research and Innovation Award: Whitney Thompson, Graduate Library Assistant, Edgewood College.
- HS Genealogy/History Achievement Award: Michelle Enke, Manager of Genealogy / Special Collections, Wichita Public Library.

==== Sharing and Transforming Access to Resources Section (STARS) ====
- Virginia Boucher Distinguished ILL (Interlibrary Loan) Librarian Award: Jalesia Horton, Director of Access and Resource Sharing Services, Southern Methodist University.

== Older awards ==
Winners of RUSA Awards for previous years are at the website of the Reference and User Services Association: RUSA Awards.
