= The Penguin Book of the Modern American Short Story =

2021 short story anthology edited by John Freeman

- Editor: John Freeman
- Publisher: Penguin Press
- Publication date: May 4, 2021
- Pages: 496
- ISBN: 978-1984877802

The Penguin Book of the Modern American Short Story is a 2021 short story anthology edited by John Freeman. Gathering 50 years of short stories, the book was published by Penguin Press.

== Critical reception ==
Kirkus Reviews called the book "A well-selected anthology of short fiction, ranging from long to flash, representing the last half-century" and "A fresh gathering that highlights the work of mostly well-known story writers through their lesser-known works."

New York Journal of Books said that the book would succeed in joining the existing array of short story anthologies, like The Best American Short Stories and the O. Henry Award compilations, thanks to its emphasis on the "modern" rather than the "best," its "literary star" editor in Freeman, and its table of contents serving as "a literal who's who of modern fiction."

Smoke Signals called Freeman's vision for the anthology "adventurous" for its juxtaposition of more established names with lesser-known ones and lauded his superb effort of "seeking in a modest way to re-shape the canon."

== Short stories included ==
Year	Author	Title	Original publication, if any
1972	Toni Cade Bambara	"The Lesson"	Gorilla, My Love
1972	Grace Paley	"A Conversation With My Father"	New American Review
1973	Ursula K. Le Guin	"The Ones Who Walk Away from Omelas"	New Dimensions 3
1973	Raymond Carver	"Bicycles, Muscles, Cigarettes"	Will You Please Be Quiet, Please?
1973	Alice Walker	"The Flowers"	In Love & Trouble: Stories of Black Women
1978	Jamaica Kincaid	"Girl"	The New Yorker
1981	Louise Erdrich	"The Red Convertible"	Love Medicine
1982	Isaac Bashevis Singer	"The Reencounter"	
1982	Joy Williams	"Taking Care"	Taking Care
1983	Lydia Davis	"Story"	Break It Down
1984	Charles Johnson	"China"	The Sorcerer's Apprentice
1984	Stuart Dybek	"Pet Milk"	The New Yorker
1986	Susan Sontag	"The Way We Live Now"	The New Yorker
1986	Sandra Cisneros	"Salvador Late or Early"	Woman Hollering Creek and Other Stories
1986	Tim O'Brien	"The Things They Carried"	Esquire
1988	Dorothy Allison	"River of Names"	Lavender Mansions
1991	Denis Johnson	"Emergency"	The New Yorker
1994	George Saunders	"Sticks"	Story
1996	Junot Díaz	"Fiesta, 1980"	Story
1998	Lucia Berlin	"Silence"	Fourteen Hills
1998	Nathan Englander	"The Twenty-Seventh Man"	For the Relief of Unbearable Urges
1998	Tobias Wolff	"Bullet in the Brain"	The New Yorker
1998	Rick Bass	"The Hermit's Story"	The Paris Review
1998	Jhumpa Lahiri	"A Temporary Matter"	The New Yorker
1999	Andrew Holleran	"The Penthouse"	In September, the Light Changes
1999	Percival Everett	"The Fix"	New York Stories
2000	Edwidge Danticat	"Water Child"	The New Yorker
2003	Chimamanda Ngozi Adichie	"The American Embassy"	Prism International
2005	Aleksandar Hemon	"The Conductor"	The New Yorker
2007	Karen Russell	"St. Lucy's Home for Girls Raised by Wolves"	"St. Lucy's Home for Girls Raised by Wolves"
2010	Claire Vaye Watkins	"The Last Thing We Need"	Granta
2011	Ken Liu	"The Paper Menagerie"	The Magazine of Fantasy & Science Fiction
2011	Stephen King	"The Dune"	Granta
2011	Julie Otsuka	"Diem Perdidi"	Granta
2015	Ted Chiang	"The Great Silence"	E-flux
2016	Lauren Groff	"The Midnight Zone"	The New Yorker
2019	Manuel Muñoz	"Anyone Can Do It"	Zyzzyva
