= Cold Crematorium =

1950 book by József Debreczeni

Cold Crematorium: Reporting from the Land of Auschwitz
- Author: József Debreczeni
- Original title: Hideg krematórium
- Language: Hungarian
- Subject: Author's Holocaust experiences
- Published: 1950
- Publisher: St. Martin's Press (English translation)
- Publication place: Yugoslavia
- English publication date: 2023
- Media type: Non-fiction book
- Awards: Híd Prize (1975); Sophie Brody Award (2025)
- ISBN: 978-1250290533 (English translation)

Cold Crematorium: Reporting from the Land of Auschwitz (Hungarian: Hideg krematórium) is a Holocaust memoir by József Debreczeni (1905–1978), the pen name of József Bruner, a journalist and poet. The book, written in Hungarian and first published in Yugoslavia in 1950, remained obscure until 2023, when it was published in English and other languages. Critics have described it as a stunning and unique account of life as a prisoner in Nazi concentration camps.

The book differs from other Holocaust books because it was written shortly after the war by a trained observer, and because of its dispassionate, journalistic approach. It has been compared to the Holocaust testimonials of Elie Wiesel, Primo Levi, Charlotte Delbo and Imre Kertész.

The book describes in intricate detail the deprivation inmates suffered, their starvation and dehumanization, and explores in depth the inmate hierarchy of the camps. The "cold crematorium" of the title is the barracks for the dying where the author was confined for a time, in which inmates dwelled amid filth and degradation.

== Background ==
József Debreczeni, a Hungarian Jew, lived in the Vojvodina region of Yugoslavia. In the spring of 1944, he, his wife, and parents were among the 400,000 Hungarian Jews deported to Auschwitz concentration camp after Germany invaded Hungary. Debreczeni was the only survivor of his immediate family. His wife Lenka, father Fabian, and his father's wife Sidonia all were murdered. By the end of the war, 560,000 Hungarian Jews had been killed.

Debreczeni was deported from Yugoslavia to three Nazi concentration camps, each one worse than the previous one. In May 1944 he was transported in a boxcar to Auschwitz with other prisoners from an internment camp in Bačka Topola, Vojvodina. At the time of their arrival, the prisoners knew nothing about Auschwitz.

In Auschwitz, weaker, older and nearsighted prisoners were separated from the other prisoners and were never seen again. Debreczeni later learned that they were gassed and cremated. Prisoners could choose to be transported to a destination by truck to avoid a long uphill walk, which they did not know meant their extermination. At Auschwitz the prisoners were fed small quantities of barely edible food: "dark, bran-congested bread" as well as horse sausage and a margarine, all carefully calculated to barely sustain life for a short period of time. The prisoners are constantly in motion and are dressed in striped uniforms and ill-fitting wooden shoes "uncomfortable, like handcuffs." He writes that "the ceaseless distress and physical and psychological exhaustion drape a fog before my eyes." The Birkenau gas chamber crematorium's chimney belched out smoke from burning corpses day and night and "there is no escaping the spectacle."

After a brief, unspecified period of time in Auschwitz, Debreczeni was then transported by boxcar with other prisoners to Arbeitslager Riese, a group of thirteen forced labor subcamps of the Gross-Rosen concentration camp, located in the Owl Mountains in Lower Silesia. The AL Riese subcamps served Project Riese, a giant underground construction project of Nazi Germany between 1943 and 1945. The inmates were Jews deported from various parts of Europe. Debreczeni was set to work building underground fortifications, laboring fourteen hours a day, as the camp became more crowded with prisoners sent from Poland.

Debreczeni was in three camps in AL Riese – first in AL Falkenberg (aka Eule, in Sowina (pl)), next in AL Fürstenstein (Książ Castle, in Wałbrzych), and lastly in AL Dörnhau (in Kolce), which served as both a labor camp and a "hospital camp". His health was steadily declining, and he was confined in wretched conditions to a barracks for the dying, the "cold crematorium". The prisoners were infested with lice and lived among excrement. "Our blankets are swarming with silvery-glistening colonies of larvae." Sanitation was absent, and "bouts of diarrhea afflict some men 20 times a day." "Everyone has diarrhea. Hence the horrid yellow streams along the rows of beds." As in previous camps, the hierarchy of privileged prisoners was extensive, with all prisoner functionaries having the power of life and life over other prisoners.

The winter of 1944–1945 was harsh, with heavy snows and extreme temperatures. He contracted diarrhea, and by January 20 he weighed 35 kg (77 lb). Thanks to a friend who brought him extra food, he survived. He subsequently contracted typhus but survived with the help of a camp doctor. Soviet forces liberated the camp in May 1945, and he recovered at a Soviet hospital.

== Explanation of error in the glossary ==
In the glossary (p. 243) of the English translation, under Gross-Rosen, it is stated that “Debreczeni was imprisoned in the Mülhausen [sic] camp in the province of Eule, and in the Fürstenstein and Dörnhau camps.”

However, Mühlhausen was a subcamp of Buchenwald. It was quite far (and different) from the camps described in the book, and was not the name of the camp in Eule. There is no indication in the text of book that Debreczeni was ever in the Mühlhausen subcamp.

In the book, Debreczeni does reference initially arriving by train at “a tiny, one-story station, or rather, guardhouse: Mühlhausen” (p. 59), and being accompanied by “our new Mühlhausen guards” (p. 61) on foot, en route to the new camp. However, he then (correctly) identifies this new camp as Eule.

However, Eule (the camp) was only a nickname – the official name of the camp was AL Falkenberg. This camp was located in the hamlet of Sowina (pl) (German: Eule; English: owl) (in Ludwikowice Kłodzkie village, Gmina Nowa Ruda district, Kłodzko County) – near the village of Sokolec (German: Falkenberg).

All three camps – AL Falkenberg (aka Eule, in Sowina), AL Fürstenstein (Książ Castle, in Wałbrzych), and AL Dörnhau (in Kolce) – were part of the proximate (in both geography and purpose) cluster of thirteen labor camps known as Arbeitslager Riese, which supplied forced labor (mostly Jews from Hungary, Poland and Greece) for Project Riese (English: giant), the code name for a giant underground construction project of Nazi Germany between 1943 and 1945, located in the Owl Mountains (German: Eulengebirge; Polish: Góry Sowie) in Lower Silesia (then Province of Lower Silesia; now Lower Silesian Voivodeship). All of the AL Riese camps were subcamps of Gross-Rosen (and rather distant from the Gross-Rosen main camp in Rogoźnica).

== Synopsis ==
At the time of the deportation, Debreczeni was already an experienced journalist, which enabled him "not only to describe his personal experience in gripping detail but also to cast a detached, analytic light on it."

He dwells at length on the organization of the camps, which relied on prisoners, sometimes picked at random, working as functionaries. At Auschwitz, Debreczeni was introduced to the camp hierarchy, which consisted of prisoners appointed by Nazi SS guards. Some kapo prisoner overseers were assigned to the corporations that utilized slave labor from the camps, and their uniforms reflected that. This "aristocratic hierarchy" of kapos, elders, and clerks reflected the Nazi interpretation of the concept of "divide and conquer", Debreczeni writes. The Germans were largely invisible. The SS and prisoner functionaries are frequently brutal. Prisoners are subjected to lethal violence for minor or trumped-up infractions, including canings that result in death. One SS officer, "Half Arm", "shoots a good worker just because he can. 'A little demonstration,' he says. 'An example of how even the best Jew must croak.'"

He also describes in detail the dehumanization of the inmates. In the bathhouse they're told to "'Open your snouts.' We understood all too well: not mouths, but snouts." Debreczeni is assigned a number, 33031. "Starting now, that's my number. I'm no longer me but 33031." His name disappears, and his number "becomes the sole distinguishing mark of my future existence," which is "etched into me within moments." In conversations among themselves, they refer to their given names in the past tense. Another prisoner says to him "'My name was Farkas. Dr. Farkas.' I too say my onetime name. For the first time since I've been here." "'Was' is the crucial word," a Jewish Chronicle reviewer noted.

Debreczeni refers to the Gross-Rosen camp as being part of the "Land of Auschwitz", in which hunger is constant, the "instinct of disgust" vanishes and prisoners are plagued by starvation and thirst. Some are addicted to tobacco and give up their food ration in return for a meager amount of it. At his lowest ebb, he writes, "I do not wish for life, nor do I wish for death. Neither promises a thing."

Throughout his stay in the camps, conditions worsen, and remain horrific even after the SS guards abandon the camp in May 1945. The "cold crematorium" is the nadir of his experiences in the camp. "It took time getting used to, but once Initiated among the screaming, naked, wild men, I too was one of them." A New York Times reviewer called his account of his time there "a panoptic depiction of hell." Prisoners are constantly dying, and the tiers of bunks are separated by rivers of diarrhea, which over time became knee-deep. After he is transported to a room for typhus patients, his fellow prisoners include a dying man known as "the anteater", who "sticks out his cracked, white tongue and licks up the squirming lice underneath."

Throughout, Debreczeni reserves his greatest contempt and anger for prisoner functionaries. "One of the Nazis' diabolical insights, he repeatedly insists, was that the 'best slave driver is a slave accorded a privileged position.'" He describes them as "truncheon-thrashing murderers, the gold traffickers, those who'd stomp on bellies with bull-pizzle whips in their hands," who before confinement were the dregs of society, "schnorrers, nebbishes, schlemiels, freeloaders, rogues, swindlers, idlers, slackers."

Due to their accumulated fortunes, obtained through trafficking in stolen food and gold teeth pulled from the mouths of corpses, every prisoner functionary managed to escape the Dörnhau camp when it was abandoned by the SS one night in May 1945, though some in other camps were summarily killed. He writes with contempt about his fellow inmates as well. Even after the Nazis left, he observed that "in that initial tumult of rapture," food and care "do not find their way to the lame. The bed-ridden are now even more abandoned and the dying are dropping dead even more pitifully than yesterday" despite large stocks of "sugar, potatoes and canned goods." When one liberated prisoner "presses a burning cigar into the corner of the mouth of a fresh corpse," Debreczeni writes that if he had a weapon "I'd shoot the vile stripling without a second thought."

== Critical reception ==
The original work won the Híd Prize, the highest award for Hungarian-language literature in Yugoslavia, in 1975.

The Times Literary Supplement called it "a raw and unceasingly grim account of ratcheting horror and total degradation."

Writing in The New York Times, author Menachem Kaiser praised the book's "nuance, sensitivity and texture," which he said "cuts through the tropes, unblurs the horrors." Kaiser writes: "His powers of observation are extraordinary. Everything he encounters in what he calls the Land of Auschwitz — the work sites, the barracks, the bodies, the corpses, the hunger, the roll call, the labor, the insanity, the fear, the despair, the strangeness, the hope, the cruelty — is captured in terrifyingly sharp detail." Kaiser praised the translation from Hungarian by Paul Olchváry as "exquisite." The book's "details are so precise that any critical distance collapses — nothing's expected, nothing's dulled by cliché. It is as immediate a confrontation of the horrors of the camps as I've ever encountered," writes Kaiser.

The Washington Post called the book "unforgettable" and described Debreczeni as an older counterpart to Primo Levi, who "used his scientific training as a chemist to similar effect." But reviewer Susan Rubin Suleiman expressed regret that despite a Foreword by Jonathan Freedland and an Afterword by Debreczeni's American nephew, Alexander Bruner, little is said about Debreczeni's life before or after the war, and she "even had to look up his birth and death dates."

In a review in The Guardian, University of Oxford professor Joe Moshenska praised the book's "harrowing detail" and wrote that "here are in this coruscating bolt of truth none of the implausibilities and glib moral take-homes that have plagued and devalued Holocaust fictions, from Life Is Beautiful to The Boy in the Striped Pyjamas." "It is as factual as a newspaper report, without overt attempts to play on readers' emotions. That's its power," said a Jerusalem Post reviewer.

Wall Street Journal critic Malcolm Forbes compared the book to Primo Levi's 1947 book If This Is a Man and called it a "crucial contribution to Holocaust literature" that "enlarges our understanding of 'life' in Auschwitz." Author Lyndsey Stonebridge wrote in New Statesman that like Levi, "his writing is distinguished by a patient, forensic, measured attentiveness to the complex and innovative horror of the Nazi camps." Stonebridge observed that "Debreczeni is acute on the link between the ruthlessness of big capitalism and the deliberate lawlessness of the camps." Three German industrial combines leased slave labor from the Nazi state: Baugesellschaft, a construction company; George Urban AG, above-ground engineering; "and the dreaded Kemna, an underground engineering company."

In The Jewish Chronicle, reviewer David Herman wrote that Debreczeni "has a journalist's eye for the telling human detail, how quickly people are dehumanized."

The American Library Association honored it with the Sophie Brody Award in 2025 noting "Cold Crematorium stands among the foremost Holocaust testimonials."

== Publication history ==
Following its original publication in Hungarian, a translation of the book into Serbo-Croatian by Bogdan Čiplić titled Hladni krematorijum was released in 1951. The book was reprinted twice in Serbia after its initial publication there, but was not published in Hungary until 2024 despite strong interest in the Holocaust, which was taboo during the years of Communist rule. Alexander Bruner, son of Debreczeni's brother Mirko Bruner, writes in an Afterword to the book that Mirko "made numerous attempts to interested American publishers in translating and publishing the book in English" while he was stationed in Washington as a Yugoslavian diplomat in the 1950s, but that he was "rebuffed at every turn." The New York Times review reported that "the book remained obscure for decades, squeezed by Cold War politics — too Soviet-philic for the West, too Jew-centric for the East."

== See also ==
- The Holocaust in Hungary
