= József Debreczeni =

Hungarian author and journalist (1905–1978)

- Born: József Bruner; October 13, 1905; Budapest, Hungary
- Died: April 26, 1978 (aged 72); Belgrade, Yugoslavia
- Occupations: Author; poet; playwright; journalist; translator
- Writing career
- Pen name: József Debreczeni
- Notable work: Cold Crematorium: Reporting From the Land of Auschwitz

József Debreczeni (13 October 1905 – 26 April 1978) was a writer and translator, and a survivor and memoirist of the Hungarian Holocaust, with his book Cold Crematorium: Reporting From the Land of Auschwitz, first published in 1950.

Debreczeni was a pen name for József Bruner. He was born in Budapest in 1905, moving to Belgrade after World War II. He had been a journalist and newspaper editor, and was dismissed from his post during the War because he was Jewish. In 1944, he was deported to Auschwitz concentration camp. Debreczeni endured forced labour in three concentration camps – AL Falkenberg (a.k.a. Eule, in Sowina (pl)), AL Fürstenstein (Książ Castle, in Wałbrzych), and AL Dörnhau (in Kolce) – all three part of the Project Riese subcamps of the Gross-Rosen concentration camp. After settling in Belgrade in 1945, he published in newspapers and magazines, as well as translating literature from several countries. Several of Debreczeni's plays were staged, and he authored poetry and books. He died in Belgrade in 1978.

Debreczeni won the Híd Prize, a Hungarian literary award, for his Holocaust memoir in 1975. Originally published in 1950, it was translated into English by Paul Olchváry and published in 2023 as Cold Crematorium: Reporting From the Land of Auschwitz.

Cold Crematorium, which received highly favorable reviews upon its 2023 republication, was reprinted twice in Serbia after its initial publication there, but was not published in Hungary until 2024 despite strong interest in the Holocaust, which was taboo during the years of Communist rule. Alexander Bruner, son of Debreczeni's brother Mirko Bruner, writes in an Afterword to the book that Mirko "made numerous attempts to interest American publishers in translating and publishing the book in English" while he was stationed in Washington as a Yugoslavian diplomat in the 1950s, but that he was "rebuffed at every turn." A New York Times review reported that "the book remained obscure for decades, squeezed by Cold War politics — too Soviet-philic for the West, too Jew-centric for the East.

The American Library Association honored Cold Crematorium with the Sophie Brody Award in 2025, noting it "stands among the foremost Holocaust testimonials."
