= John Freeman (author) =

American writer and a literary critic (born 1974)

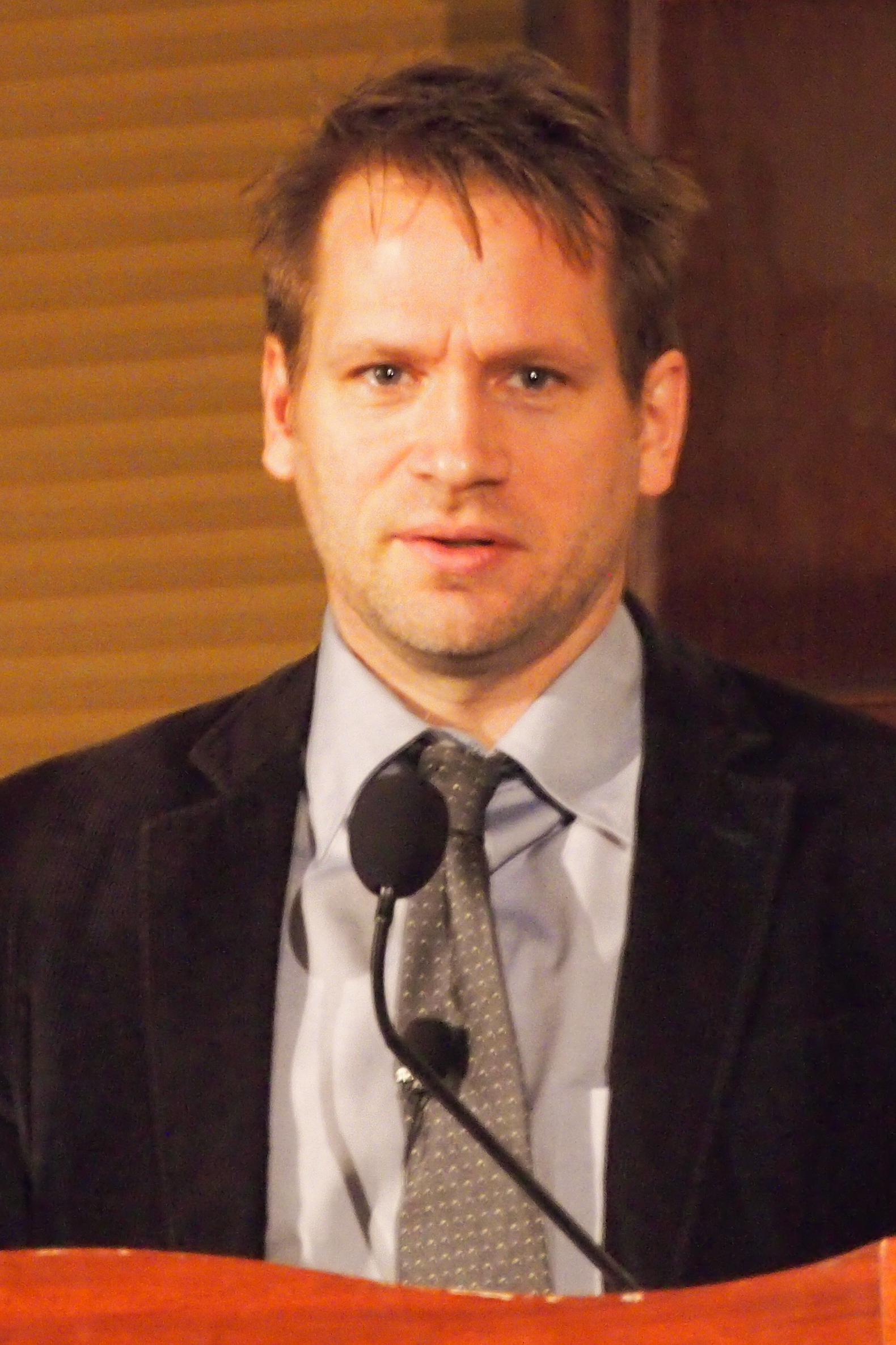
- Freeman in 2017
- Born: 1974 (age 51–52); Cleveland, Ohio, United States
- Education: Swarthmore College
- Occupations: Writer and literary critic

John Freeman (born 1974) is an American writer and a literary critic. He was the editor of the literary magazine Granta from 2009 until 2013, the former president of the National Book Critics Circle, and his writing has appeared in almost 200 English-language publications around the world, including The New York Times Book Review, the Los Angeles Times, The Guardian, and The Wall Street Journal. He is currently an executive editor at the publishing house Knopf.

== Early life ==
John Freeman was born in Cleveland, Ohio, grew up in New York, Pennsylvania and California, and graduated from Swarthmore College in 1996.

== Career ==
Freeman's first book, The Tyranny of E-mail: The Four-Thousand Year Journey to Your Inbox, was published in 2009. (It was published in Australia under the title Shrinking the World: The 4,000-year story of how email came to rule our lives.) Freeman's second book, a collection of his interviews with major contemporary writers titled How to Read a Novelist, was published in the US in 2013 by Farrar, Straus and Giroux. (It was originally published in Australia in 2012.) The book features profiles of Margaret Atwood, John Updike, Geoff Dyer, Toni Morrison, Haruki Murakami, and others.

During his six years on the board of the National Book Critics Circle, Freeman launched a campaign to raise awareness of the cutbacks in book coverage in national print media and to save book review sections.

Freeman joined the UK-based Granta magazine in December 2008, became acting editor in May 2009, and he was named its editor in October 2009. While at the magazine, he edited Mary Gaitskill, Kenzaburō Ōe, Rana Dasgupta, Dinaw Mengestu, Peter Carey, Jeanette Winterson, Natsuo Kirino, Victor LaValle, Herta Müller, Daniel Alarcón, Wole Soyinka, Aleksandar Hemon, Salman Rushdie, Yiyun Li, Tony D'Souza, Colum McCann, Ngũgĩ wa Thiong'o, George Saunders, Marie Darrieussecq, Joshua Ferris, Aminatta Forna, Jim Crace, Richard Russo, Kamila Shamsie, Mo Yan, A. L. Kennedy, Mohsin Hamid, and Chimamanda Adichie. Writers who debuted in Granta during Freeman's tenure include Chinelo Okparanta, Phil Klay, Claire Vaye Watkins, and Maria Venegas. Freeman left Granta in 2013.

Freeman edits a series of anthologies of fiction, nonfiction, and poetry entitled Freeman's, published by Grove/Atlantic. The first anthology appeared in October 2015, with new anthologies published once a year. Explaining his vision for Freeman's, he says: "I want it to be a home for the long form... I hope it introduces new writers, and coaxes great ones to do something other than book-length writing." His anthologies are now published yearly and are currently translated into Italian, Chinese, Romanian and other languages.

His book of poetry, Maps, was published in 2017. The Park, his second book of poems, was published in 2020.

Freeman was on the juries for the 2018 National Book Award for nonfiction and the Scotiabank Giller Prize.

Between 2014 and 2020, he edited a trilogy of anthologies about inequality, including Tales of Two Cities, Tales of Two Americas, and Tales of Two Planets. During this time, he also he served as executive director of Literary Hub.

Freeman edits a yearly poetry anthology for the Italian press Edizioni Black Coffee, along with the Italian translator Damiano Abeni. The series is called Nuova poesia americana and includes poems by six different poets (in the first volume of the series, Freeman and Abeni chose Tracy K. Smith, Terrance Hayes, Layli Long Soldier, Robin Coste Lewis, Natalie Diaz and Robert L. Hass). A new volume will be published yearly in December.

He is an artist-in-residence at New York University and a contributing editor of ZYZZYVA Astra Magazine and Orion Magazine.

During the COVID-19 pandemic, he started a California Book Club with Alta magazine, which reads and discusses a work of significant literature from or about California on a monthly zoom call. Guests have included Walter Mosley, Maxine Hong Kingston, Natalie Diaz, and Héctor Tobar, among others.

In 2021, Freeman collated the critically acclaimed anthology The Penguin Book of the Modern American Short Story.

Freeman joined the publishing company Knopf as an executive editor in 2021.

== Personal life ==
Freeman lives in New York City.

== Bibliography ==
=== Nonfiction ===
- The Tyranny of E-mail: The Four-Thousand Year Journey to Your Inbox. New York: Scribner. 2009. ISBN 978-1416576730.
- How to Read a Novelist. New York: FSG Originals. 2013. ISBN 978-0374173265.
- Dictionary of the Undoing. New York: MCD x FSG Originals. 2019. ISBN 978-0374538859.
- California Rewritten: A Journey Through the Golden State's New Literature. Berkeley: Heyday. 2025. ISBN 978-1597146920.

=== Fiction ===
- "Hit and Run" Everand Originals. Apr 10, 2024. autobiographical fiction. ISBN 9781094472430

=== Poetry ===
- Maps. Port Townsend: Copper Canyon. 2017. ISBN 978-1556595233.
- The Park. Port Townsend: Copper Canyon. 2020. ISBN 978-1556595950.
- Wind, Trees. Port Townsend: Copper Canyon. 2022. ISBN 978-1556596483.

=== As editor ===
- Tales of Two Cities: The Best and Worst of Times in Today's New York. New York: OR Books/Penguin. 2014. ISBN 978-1939293633.
- Tales of Two Americas: Stories of Inequality in a Divided Nation. New York: OR Books/Penguin. 2017. ISBN 978-1682190814.
- Tales of Two Planets: Stories of Climate Change and Inequality in a Divided World. New York: OR Books/Penguin. 2020. ISBN 978-1682192375.
- The Penguin Book of the Modern American Short Story. New York: Penguin. 2021. ISBN 9781984877802.
- There's a Revolution Outside, My Love, coedited with Tracy K Smith. New York: Vintage. 2021. ISBN 9780593314692.

=== Books only in Italian ===
- Nuova poesia americana, volume I. Florence: Edizioni Black Coffee. 2019. ISBN 9788894833270.
- Nuova poesia americana, volume II. Florence: Edizioni Black Coffee. 2020. ISBN 9788894833430.
- Nuova poesia americana, volume III. Florence: Edizioni Black Coffee. 2021. ISBN 9788894833669.

=== Selected poems available online ===
- "Allowances". The New Yorker. February 13–20, 2012.
- "Rockland". The New Yorker. May 19, 2014.
- "Barber". The Nation. December 16, 2014.
- "The Boy Under the Car". Boston Review. May 22, 2013.
- "English Hours". The Common. March 16, 2015. Archived from the original on July 21, 2015.
- "The Ex-Basketball Players". The New Yorker. April 13, 2020.
- "Friendship". Alta Journal. April 5, 2022.
- "Among The Trees". The New Yorker. September 26, 2022.
- "The Green Tram". The Atlantic. October 23, 2022.
