= Boris Fishman =

American writer

- Born: 1979 (age 46–47); Minsk, Byelorussian Soviet Socialist Republic (now Belarus)
- Education: Princeton University (BA); New York University (MFA)
- Occupation: Writer

Boris Fishman (born 1979) is a Belarusian-born American writer. He is the author of the novels Don’t Let My Baby Do Rodeo (2016), A Replacement Life (2014), and The Unwanted (2025), and the memoir Savage Feast (2019).

He and his wife appeared on the fourth season of the television show Couples Therapy.

== Early life ==
Fishman was born in Soviet Minsk, to a family of Jewish-Soviet origin. Fishman immigrated to the U.S. in 1988 with his family. He holds a BA in Russian literature from Princeton University and an MFA from New York University.

== Career ==
Fishman is the author of the novel A Replacement Life, a 2014 New York Times Notable Book of the Year, which won the VCU Cabell First Novelist Award and the American Library Association's Sophie Brody Medal. The novel tells the story of a young Jewish-Soviet immigrant who assists his grandfather in defrauding the Conference on Jewish Material Claims Against Germany. Fishman's second novel, Don't Let My Baby Do Rodeo, a 2016 New York Times Notable Book of the Year, tells the story of a New Jersey couple who adopt a difficult baby from Montana. His third book, Savage Feast, is a family history told through recipes. The Unwanted is the story of a family in flight from civil war in an unnamed country.

He has contributed personal essays, literary criticism, reporting, travelogues, and food writing to The New Yorker, The New York Times Magazine, The Guardian, The Washington Post, The Wall Street Journal, Travel + Leisure (where he is a contributing writer), Food & Wine, and other publications.

He taught in Princeton University's Creative Writing Program from 2015 to 2020, followed by the University of Montana in Missoula, Montana, where he taught in the MFA program. In 2024, he became a professor of creative writing and literature teaching the inaugural class at the University of Austin in Austin, Texas.
