= The Book of Aron =

2015 novel by Jim Shepard

- Author: Jim Shepard
- Language: English
- Published: May 12, 2015
- Publisher: Knopf Publishing Group
- Publication place: United States
- Media type: Print (paperback, hardcover)
- ISBN: 9781101874318

The Book of Aron is a historical fiction novel by Jim Shepard, published May 12, 2015 by Knopf Publishing Group.

== Reception ==
The Book of Aron received starred reviews from Kirkus, Library Journal, Shelf Awareness, and Booklist, as well as positive reviews from The Guardian, The Boston Globe, The New York Times Book Review, The Washington Post, NPR, The Seattle Times, The Toronto Star, and the Jewish Book Council.

Writing for Booklist, Donna Seaman noted, "Shepard’s magnificent tour de force will hold a prominent place in the literature of compassionate outrage."

Library Journal's Patrick Sullivan wrote, "Surrounded by devastation, hopelessness, and cruelty, [the main character] becomes an exemplar of all that is good and decent in the human spirit. Few will be able to read the last terrible, inspiring pages without tears in their eyes."

Publishers Weekly provided a mixed review stating, "Shepard is a master with a light touch—but against the backdrop of the Holocaust, maybe a bit too light. Although this novel paints an unflinching portrait of the ghetto, many characters seem to stand in for ideas, and the limp plot is propped up only by Shepard’s eye for detail."

Kirkus, The Washington Post, BuzzFeed, The San Francisco Chronicle, and Huffington Post named The Book of Aron one of the best fiction books of the year.

Awards for The Book of Aron
Year	Award	Result	Ref.
2016	Booklist's Best Historical Fiction	Top 10	
2016	Carnegie Medal for Excellence in Fiction	Shortlist	
2016	Reference and User Services Association's Notable Fiction Books	Selection	
2016	Sophie Brody Award	Winner	
2015	Kirkus Prize for Fiction	Finalist	
2015	Booklist Editors' Choice for Adult Books	Selection	
2015	JJ Greenberg Memorial Award	Finalist	
