= Born to Kvetch =

2005 book by Michael Wex devoted to Yiddish

Born to Kvetch: Yiddish Language and Culture in All Its Moods
- Author: Michael Wex
- Language: English
- Subject: Yiddish
- Genre: Non-fiction
- Publisher: St. Martin's Press
- Publication date: 2005
- Publication place: United States
- ISBN: 0-312-30741-1

Born to Kvetch: Yiddish Language and Culture in All Its Moods is a 2005 book by Michael Wex devoted to Yiddish. In this book, "Wex is a rare combination of Jewish comic and scholarly cultural analyst".

The book became a New York Times Bestseller and was followed by a Yiddish phrasebook Just Say Nu.

The book is about cultural and religious influences in the Yiddish language and how the Jewish worldview is reflected in Yiddish, putting the main focus on Yiddish as a language of opposition (or "language of aggravation, of exile and alienation" as Allan Nadler puts it) during their life in diaspora, often within hostile cultures. The Yiddish word "kvetch" in the book title means "to complain", "to whine", expressing Wex's idea that Yiddish is the language of complaint, which is rooted in millennia of Jewish exile. William Grimes in his review of the book quotes it: "Judaism is defined by exile, and exile without complaint is tourism". Other flavors of Yiddish associated with the first one noted by Wex is that it is the language of dispute (influence of the tradition of Talmudic commentary) and the language is rich in insults, curses and other unpleasant things. As Wex wittingly notes: "A simple kvetch is a descriptive activity that conveys disapproval... a 'knole' ("curse"), on the other hand, is a 'kvetch' with a mission".

The book received an honourable mention from the ALA in the Sophie Brody Award 2006.
