= Sophie Brody =

Sophie M. Brody (11 December 1922 – 24 August 2004) was an American philanthropist and community volunteer.

She was married to Arthur Brody, the founder of Brodart, a library supply company.

Brody was a member of the executive board and Board of the Women's Division of United Jewish Federation. Brody and her husband Arthur founded the Sophie Brody Leadership Development Fund to fund training of future Jewish leaders by the United Jewish Federation. The American Library Association's Sophie Brody Award is named after her.

== See also ==
- Sophie Brody Award
