= Gmina Głuszyca =

Gmina Głuszyca Głuszyca Commune
- Gmina
- Coat of arms
- Interactive map of Gmina Głuszyca
- Coordinates (Głuszyca): 50°41′N 16°22′E
- Country: Poland
- Voivodeship: Lower Silesian
- County: Wałbrzych
- Seat: Głuszyca
- Sołectwos: Głuszyca Górna, Grzmiąca, Kolce, Łomnica, Sierpnica

Area
  - Total: 61.92 km^{2} (23.91 sq mi)

Population (2019-06-30)
  - Total: 8,631
  - Density: 139.4/km^{2} (361.0/sq mi)
  - Urban: 6,361
  - Rural: 2,270
- Website: https://www.gluszyca.pl

Gmina Głuszyca is an urban-rural gmina (administrative district) in Wałbrzych County, Lower Silesian Voivodeship, in south-western Poland, on the Czech border. Its seat is the town of Głuszyca, which lies approximately 13 kilometres (8 mi) south-east of Wałbrzych, and 69 kilometres (43 mi) south-west of the regional capital Wrocław.

The gmina covers an area of 61.92 square kilometres (23.9 sq mi), and as of 2019 its total population is 8,631.

== Neighbouring gminas ==
Gmina Głuszyca is bordered by the town of Jedlina-Zdrój and the gminas of Mieroszów, Nowa Ruda and Walim. It also borders the Czech Republic.

== Villages ==
Apart from the town of Głuszyca, the gmina contains the villages of Głuszyca Górna, Grzmiąca, Kolce, Łomnica and Sierpnica.
