= Sierpnica =

- Village
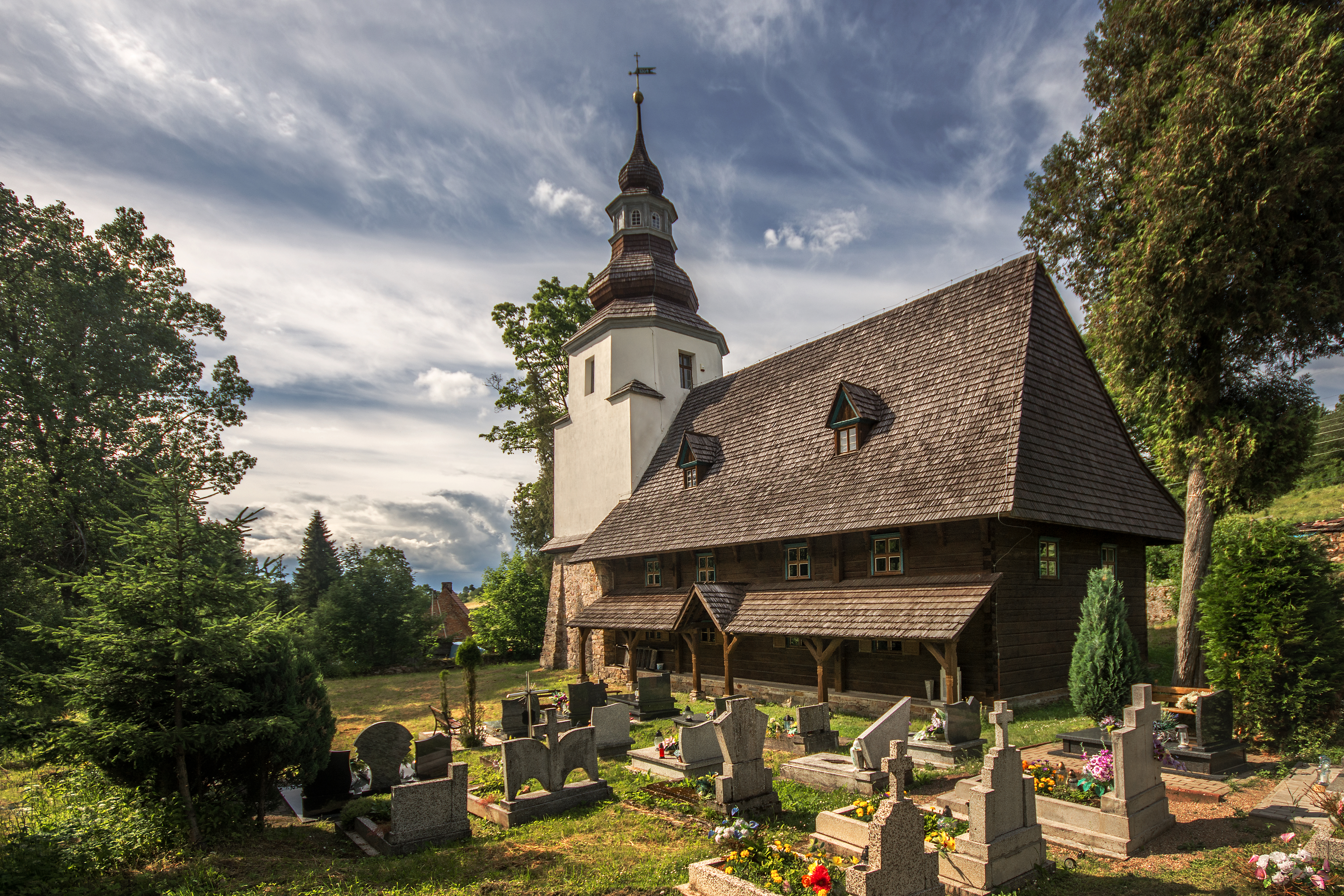
- Church of Our Lady of the Snow

- Location within Poland
- Coordinates: 50°39′34″N 16°25′25″E
- Country: Poland
- Voivodeship: Lower Silesian
- County: Wałbrzych
- Gmina: Głuszyca
- Highest elevation: 700 m (2,300 ft)
- Lowest elevation: 520 m (1,710 ft)

Population
  - Total: 180

Sierpnica [ɕɛrpˈnit͡sa] is a village in the administrative district of Gmina Głuszyca, within Wałbrzych County, Lower Silesian Voivodeship, in south-western Poland, close to the Czech border.
