= Sophie Irwin =

Romance novelist

- Education: Mansfield College, Oxford
- Years active: 2019–present

Sophie Irwin is an English historical romance novelist. Her debut novel A Lady's Guide to Fortune-Hunting (2022) was a Sunday Times bestseller and won an Alex Award. This was followed by A Lady's Guide to Scandal (2023).

== Early life ==
Irwin attended the Gryphon School, and as a teenager she worked in the local Winstone's bookshop. She went on to graduate with a degree in English from Mansfield College, Oxford. Having read Georgette Heyer and Jane Austen from a young age, Irwin wrote her dissertation on the popularity of the former during World War II.

== Career ==
Irwin began her career working as an editor in publishing. She started writing what would become her debut novel in 2019. In a two-book deal in 2021, HarperFiction (part of HarperCollins) acquired the rights to publish Irwin's debut Regency romance novel A Lady's Guide to Fortune-Hunting in 2022. The U.S. publishing rights went to Pamela Dorman Books. The novel follows a young women Kitty Talbot who seeks a wealthy husband to pay off her late parents' debt. Irwin wanted to explore the economic side of marriage in Regency society. A Lady's Guide to Fortune-Hunting debuted at #3 on the Sunday Times bestseller list, won an Alex Award, and was a RUSA Listen List selection. A second novel set in the same universe titled A Lady's Guide to Scandal was published in 2023, presenting the opposite dynamic of a widow with money.

HarperFiction acquired two further romance novels from Irwin in October 2023. Her third novel How to Lose a Lord in Ten Days was published the following year. Also in 2025, Irwin signed a deal with Century (a Penguin Random House UK imprint) to write a Georgette Heyer continuation.

== Bibliography ==
=== A Lady's Guide ===
- A Lady's Guide to Fortune-Hunting (2022)
- A Lady's Guide to Scandal (2023)

=== Standalone novels ===
- How to Lose a Lord in Ten Days (2025)

== Accolades ==
Year	Award	Category	Title	Result	Ref.
2022	Alex Awards		A Lady's Guide to Fortune-Hunting	Won	
2022	Best Book Forward Awards	Best Romance	A Lady's Guide to Fortune-Hunting	Won	
