= What We Talk About When We Talk About Anne Frank =

2012 short story collection by Nathan Englander

- First edition cover image
- Author: Nathan Englander
- Cover artist: Barbard de Wilde
- Language: English
- Genre: Fiction
- Published: 7 February 2012
- Publisher: Knopf
- Publication place: United States
- Media type: Print, e-book, audiobook
- Pages: 224 pages
- Awards: Finalist 2013 Pulitzer Prize for Fiction
- ISBN: 0307958701

What We Talk About When We Talk About Anne Frank is a 2012 short story collection by the American writer Nathan Englander. The book was first published on February 7, 2012, through Knopf and collects eight of Englander's short stories, including the title story "What We Talk About When We Talk About Anne Frank."

The title of the collection takes its influence from Raymond Carver's 1981 short story collection What We Talk About When We Talk About Love. The book was a finalist for the Pulitzer Prize for Fiction, losing to Adam Johnson's The Orphan Master's Son. Englander's collection was awarded the 2012 Frank O'Connor International Short Story Award.

== Stories ==
- "What We Talk About When We Talk About Anne Frank" was originally published in the December 12, 2011 edition of The New Yorker and was included in The Best American Short Stories of 2012. Like Carver's story, "What We Talk About When We Talk About Love," Englander's story centers around two middle-aged married couples sitting around a table and sharing a bottle of liquor (in Carver's story, it is gin and in Englander's, vodka and pot). The story is told by a first-person present narrator who is married to Debbie and they live together in South Florida. Debbie's childhood friend from Yeshiva school, Lauren, who is now known as Shoshana, is visiting from Jerusalem with her husband, Mark, who has adopted the name, Yerucham. The narrator describes Shoshana and Yerucham as having gone "off to the Holy Land and went from Orthodox to ultra-Orthodox." The climax of the story occurs when Debbie and Shoshana revive a childhood game, the Anne Frank game, in which they speculate who among their non-Jewish friends would save them in the event of a second Holocaust.
- "Sister Hills" "traces the growth of a small Israeli settlement from a couple of shacks into a thriving Jerusalem suburb, depicts the emotionally fraught relationship between two neighbors: one, named Rena, loses her husband and her three sons to the war and unhappy accident; the other, named Yehudit, has nine children and lives a vibrant, satisfying life. When Yehudit’s daughter Aheret was a baby, on the verge of death from a high fever, Yehudit was so desperate she indulged an old superstition: to outsmart the Angel of Death, she 'sold' Aheret to Rena for a pittance. Aheret survived, grew up to be a young woman, and now Rena, alone and bitter, decides to reclaim her, insisting that the girl forfeit her freedom and come to live with her as a caregiver."
- "How We Avenged the Blums" first appeared in The Atlantic (Summer/Fall 2005) and was included in the Best American Short Stories 2006.
- "Peep Show" was originally published in the July 26, 1999 edition of The New Yorker. Its protagonist, Allen Fein (formerly known as Ari Feinberg) is on his way to the Port Authority to go home to his pregnant, "beautiful blond Gentile wife," when he encounters three rabbis from his old school at a peep show. Upon seeing the rabbis, Fein feels enormous guilt for leaving his religion. He also feels guilt for having been, as he believes, unfaithful to his wife, Claire, whom he imagines is on the other side of a partition as a performer in the peep show along with his mother.
- "Everything I Know About My Family On My Mother's Side" first appeared in Esquire in July 2008 and was included in Best American Nonrequired Reading 2009.
- "Camp Sundown"
- "The Reader" first appeared in Electric Literature in September 2011.
- "Free Fruit for Young Widows" was originally published in the May 17, 2010 edition of The New Yorker and was included in Best American Short Stories 2011.

== Reception ==
Critical reception for What We Talk About When We Talk About Anne Frank has been mostly positive and the book received praise from the Washington Times, Los Angeles Times, and the Jewish Book Council.

In The New York Times, Michiko Kakutani gave the book a mixed-to-positive review, stating: "At his best, Mr. Englander manages to delineate such extreme behavior with a combination of psychological insight, allegorical gravity and sometimes uproarious comedy" but that "In several instances, however, the delicate narrative balance slips from Mr. Englander’s grasp." Kakutani also notes: "It’s the title story and “Everything I Know About My Family” that point to Mr. Englander's evolution as a writer, his ability to fuse humor and moral seriousness into a seamless narrative, to incorporate elliptical — yes, Carver-esque — techniques into his arsenal of talents to explore how faith and family (and the stories characters tell about faith and family) ineluctably shape an individual's identity."

James Lasdun's review for The Guardian was more positive, adding: "If there is an abiding theme, it is the way in which notions of right and wrong, guilt and innocence, victim and oppressor, shift over time as memories fade or new perspectives open up on old struggles." Lasdun also offered praise for Englander: "The new book (which comes garlanded with praise from just about every A-list author in America) turns out to be a remarkable collection, not least because of its courageous determination to push forward in the direction hinted at by that last story." He did, however characterize the title story as a "dud, or semi-dud" and noted: "But I suspect Englander might have pulled it off if he hadn't constrained himself so tightly within the terms of Carver's scrupulous realism."

The book received an honourable mention in the Sophie Brody Award 2013.

== Adaptation ==
A comedy play adapted from the book, starring Joshua Malina and directed by Patrick Marber opened in October 2024 at the Marylebone Theatre on Park Road in London.
