= Łomnica, Wałbrzych County =

Łomnica
- Village
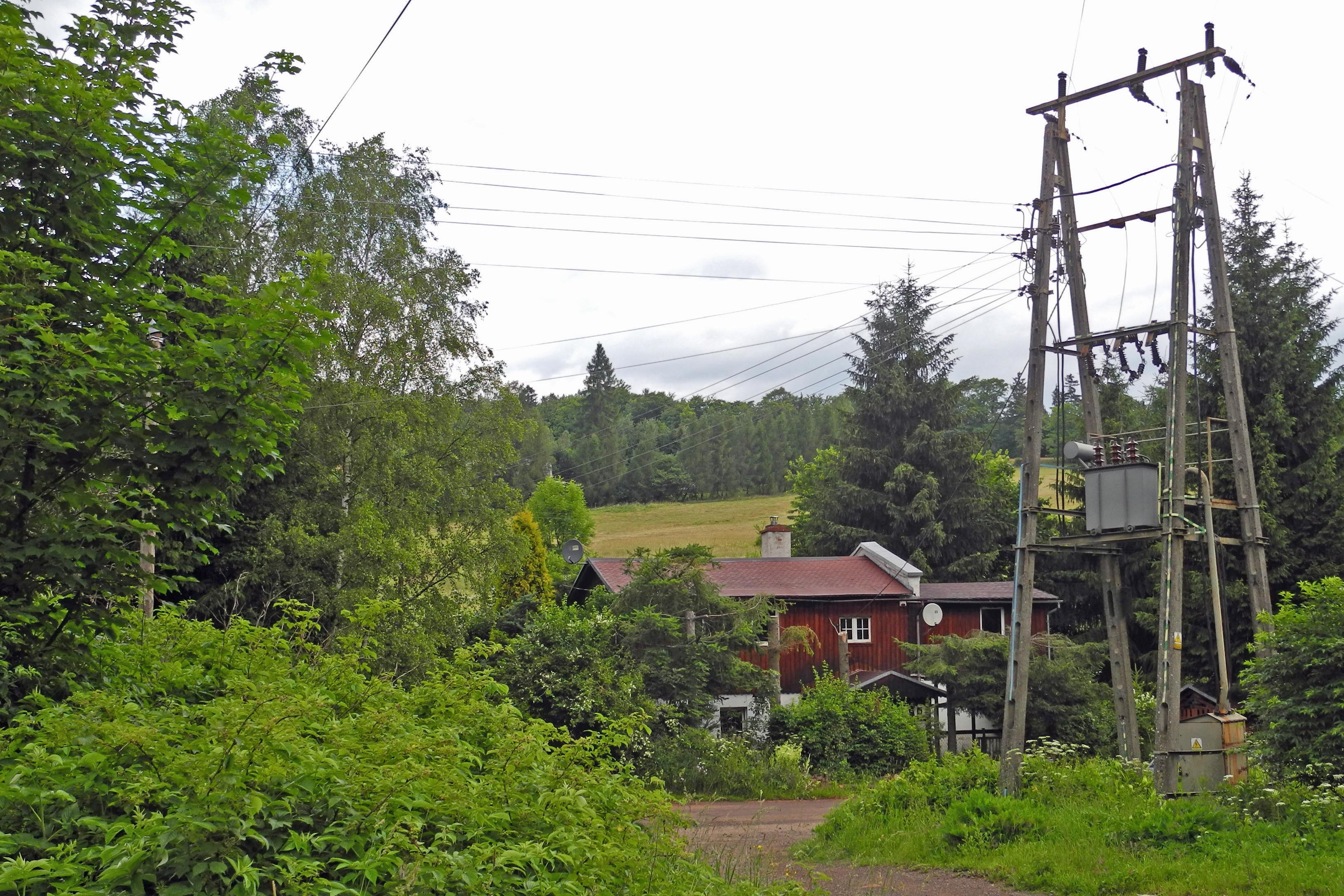
- Radosno

- Location within Poland
- Coordinates: 50°40′28″N 16°19′35″E
- Country: Poland
- Voivodeship: Lower Silesian
- County: Wałbrzych
- Gmina: Głuszyca
- Time zone: UTC+1 (CET)
  - Summer (DST): UTC+2 (CEST)
- Vehicle registration: DBA

Łomnica [wɔmˈnit͡sa] is a village in the administrative district of Gmina Głuszyca, within Wałbrzych County, Lower Silesian Voivodeship, in south-western Poland, close to the Czech border.

== Etymology ==
The name is of Polish origin, and is derived from the words łom or łomnica, which in turn come from the word łamać, meaning "to break".
