= Avner Mandelman =

Israeli-Canadian businessman and writer

- Occupation: writer
- Writing career
- Period: 2000s-present
- Notable work: The Debba
- Notable awards: Sophie Brody Award (2006)

Avner Mandelman is an Israeli-Canadian businessman and writer. His debut novel The Debba, published in 2010, won the 2011 Arthur Ellis Award for Best First Novel, and was a longlisted nominee for the 2010 Scotiabank Giller Prize.

A former hedge fund manager in Toronto, Ontario, Mandelman has also published two short story collections and the investment guide The Sleuth Investor. His short story collection Talking to the Enemy won the first Sophie Brody Award for outstanding achievement in Jewish literature from the American Library Association in 2006. Talking to the Enemy, containing stories featured in The Best American Short Stories and The Pushcart Prize Stories, was recognized as a Best Book of 2005 by Kirkus Reviews and won the J. I. Segal Award for Fiction in 2000.

== Works ==
- Talking to the Enemy (1998, ISBN 9781583227299)
- Cuckoo (2004, ISBN 9780778012382)
- The Sleuth Investor (2007, ISBN 9780071481854)
- The Debba (2010, ISBN 9781590513705)
- The Advanced Sleuth Investor (2023, ISBN 9781738804429)
- The Undertaker's Daughter (2023, ISBN 9781738804450)
- The Lady and the Gamble (2026, Amazon B0HJS4CNT3)
