= Głuszyca Górna =

- Village
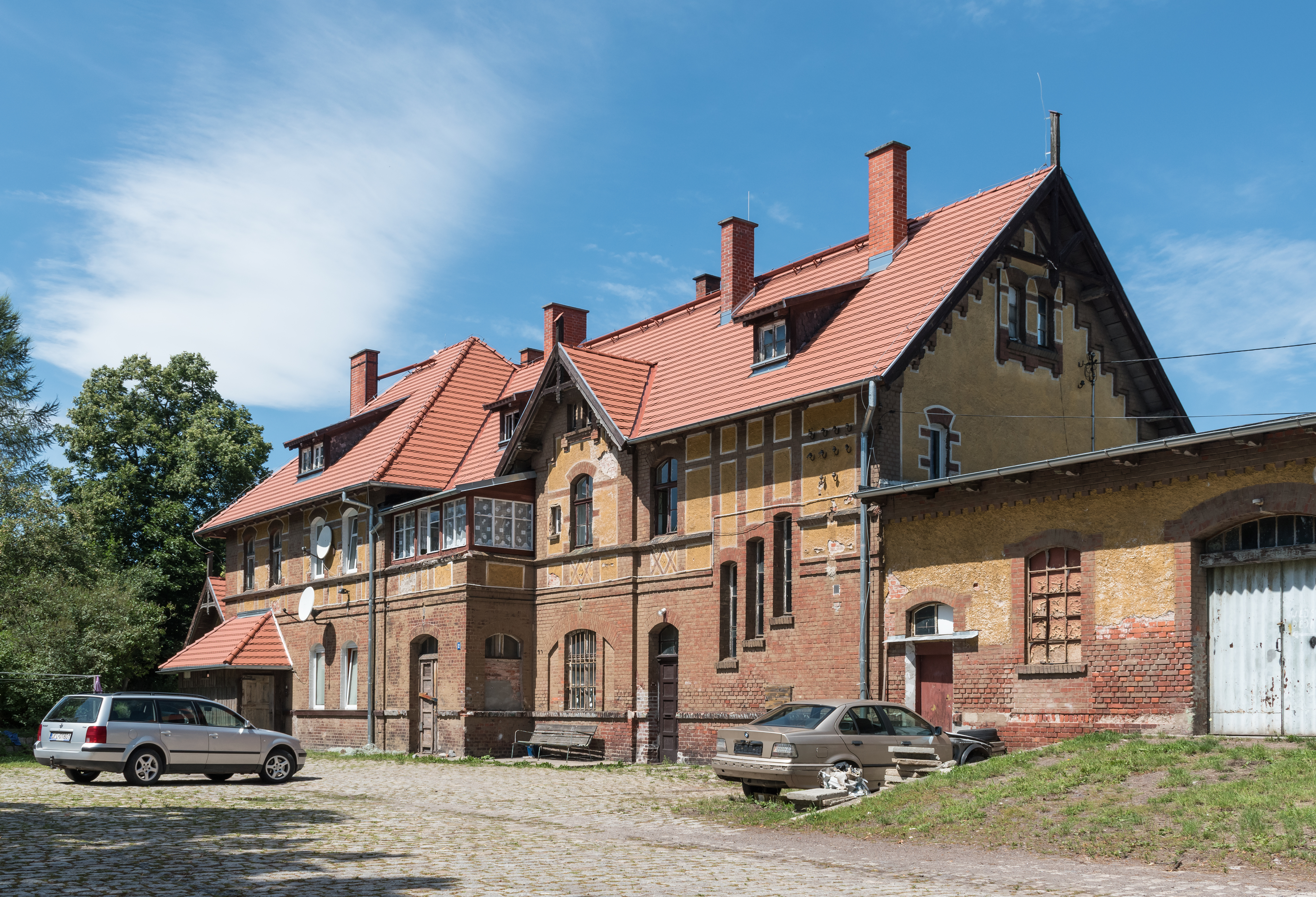
- Train station

- Location within Poland
- Coordinates: 50°40′23″N 16°22′33″E
- Country: Poland
- Voivodeship: Lower Silesian
- County: Wałbrzych
- Gmina: Głuszyca
- Time zone: UTC+1 (CET)
  - Summer (DST): UTC+2 (CEST)
- Vehicle registration: DBA

Głuszyca Górna [ɡwuˈʂɨt͡sa ˈɡurna] is a village in the administrative district of Gmina Głuszyca within Wałbrzych County, Lower Silesian Voivodeship, in south-western Poland, close to the Czech border.

During World War II, the German administration operated a forced labour camp in the village, in which they held hundreds of Italian prisoners of war.
