= Grzmiąca, Lower Silesian Voivodeship =

Grzmiąca
- Village
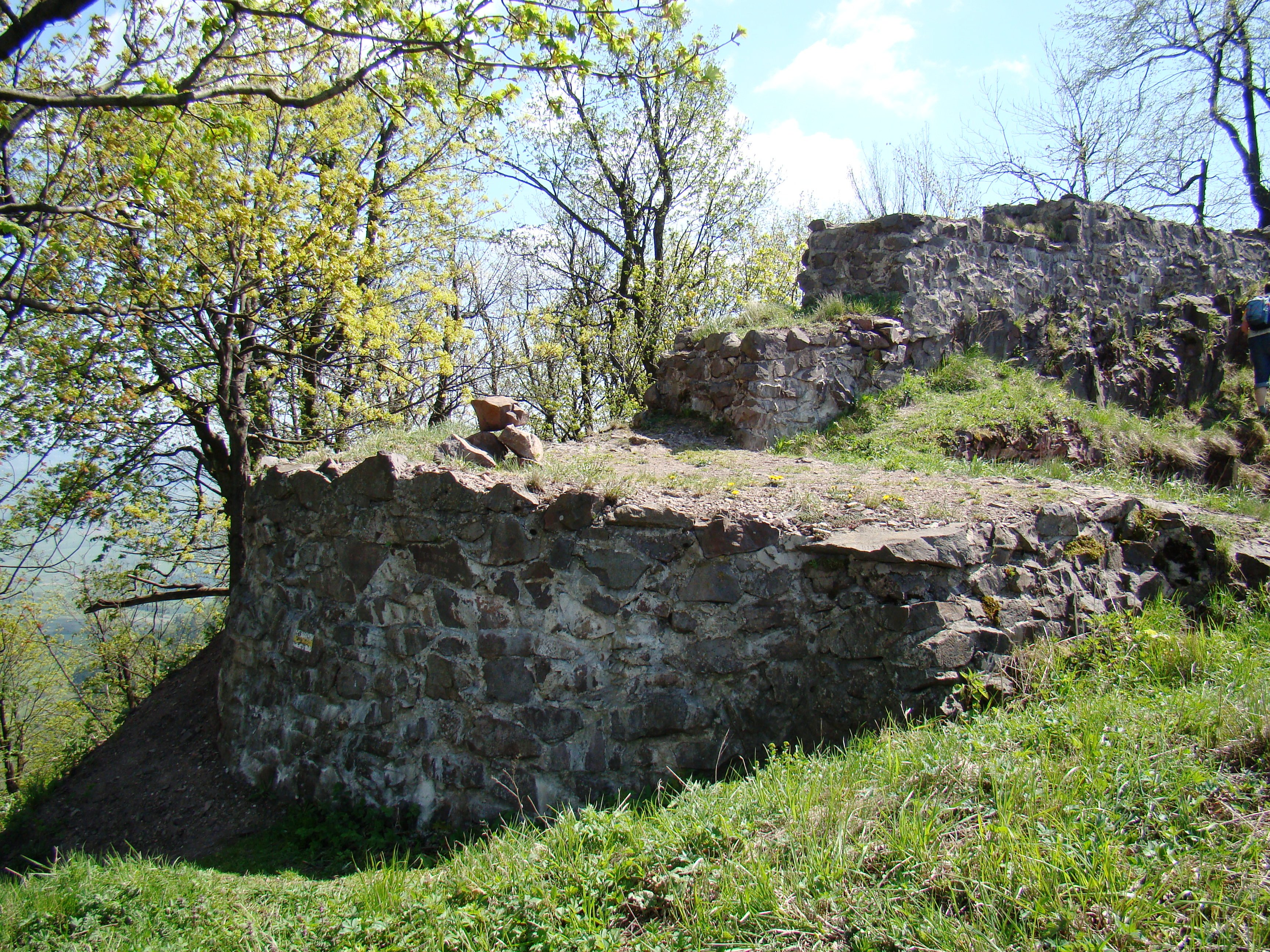
- Castle ruins

- Location within Poland
- Coordinates: 50°41′49″N 16°20′36″E
- Country: Poland
- Voivodeship: Lower Silesian
- County: Wałbrzych
- Gmina: Głuszyca

Grzmiąca [ˈɡʐmjɔnt͡sa] is a village in the administrative district of Gmina Głuszyca, within Wałbrzych County, Lower Silesian Voivodeship, in south-western Poland, close to the Czech border.
