= A Lady's Guide to Scandal =

2023 novel by Sophie Irwin

- Author: Sophie Irwin
- Language: English
- Genre: Regency romance
- Publisher: Penguin Books
- Publication date: 11 July 2023
- Publication place: United Kingdom
- ISBN: 0735245088
- OCLC: 1409785832
- Preceded by: A Lady's Guide to Fortune-Hunting

A Lady's Guide to Scandal is a regency romance novel by Sophie Irwin. The second entry in her A Lady's Guide series, it follows Eliza Balfour, who had been forced to marry the Earl of Somerset. When she is widowed at the age of 27, inheriting her husband's wealth, she is in charge of her future for the first time in her life and she moves to Bath, Somerset with her cousin. However, the earl's will stipulates that Eliza will lose her fortune if she becomes the subject of a scandal. While there, she meets her former lover Oliver, who is the new Lord Somerset, and Lord Melville, an infamous author.

== Reception ==
Lucy Helliker of the Daily Mirror stated: "Its characters are delightful, especially the irresistible Melville, and you'll find yourself longing for a happy ending." Publishers Weekly called the novel "light and enchanting" and "fun, unexpected ride from city ballrooms through country gardens, with a diverse cast, witty repartee, and plenty of laughter to go along with the love." Lauren Hackert of the School Library Journal recommended the novel to fans of Martha Waters and Sabrina Jeffries, writing that Irwin "presents a charming, chaste Regency romance. Filled with witty banter, the story is upbeat and engaging."
