= For the Relief of Unbearable Urges =

1999 short story collection by Nathan Englander

- First edition (US)
- Author: Nathan Englander
- Language: English
- Genre: Short story
- Set in: 7
- Publisher: Alfred A. Knopf (US); Faber & Faber (UK)
- Publication date: 1999
- Awards: PEN/Malamud Award, Sue Kaufman Prize for First Fiction
- ISBN: 9780375404924
- OCLC: 245836139

For the Relief of Unbearable Urges is a short story collection by Nathan Englander, first published by Knopf in 1999. It has received many positive reviews. It earned Englander a PEN/Malamud Award and the Sue Kaufman Prize for First Fiction, as well as being a finalist for the 1999 Art Seidenbaum Award for First Fiction.

The collection contains nine stories, many of which are set in the Jewish Orthodox world. The title story tells of a married Hasidic Jew who receives special dispensation from a rabbi to visit a prostitute – "for the relief of unbearable urges." The story "The Twenty-seventh Man", about Yiddish writers killed by Stalin, is an allusion to the Night of the Murdered Poets.

== Contents ==
- "The Twenty-seventh Man"
- "The Tumblers"
- "Reunion"
- "The Wig"
- "The Gilgul of Park Avenue"
- "Reb Kringle"
- "The Last One Way"
- "For the Relief of Unbearable Urges"
- "In This Way We Are Wise"
