= Maria Venegas =

American writer

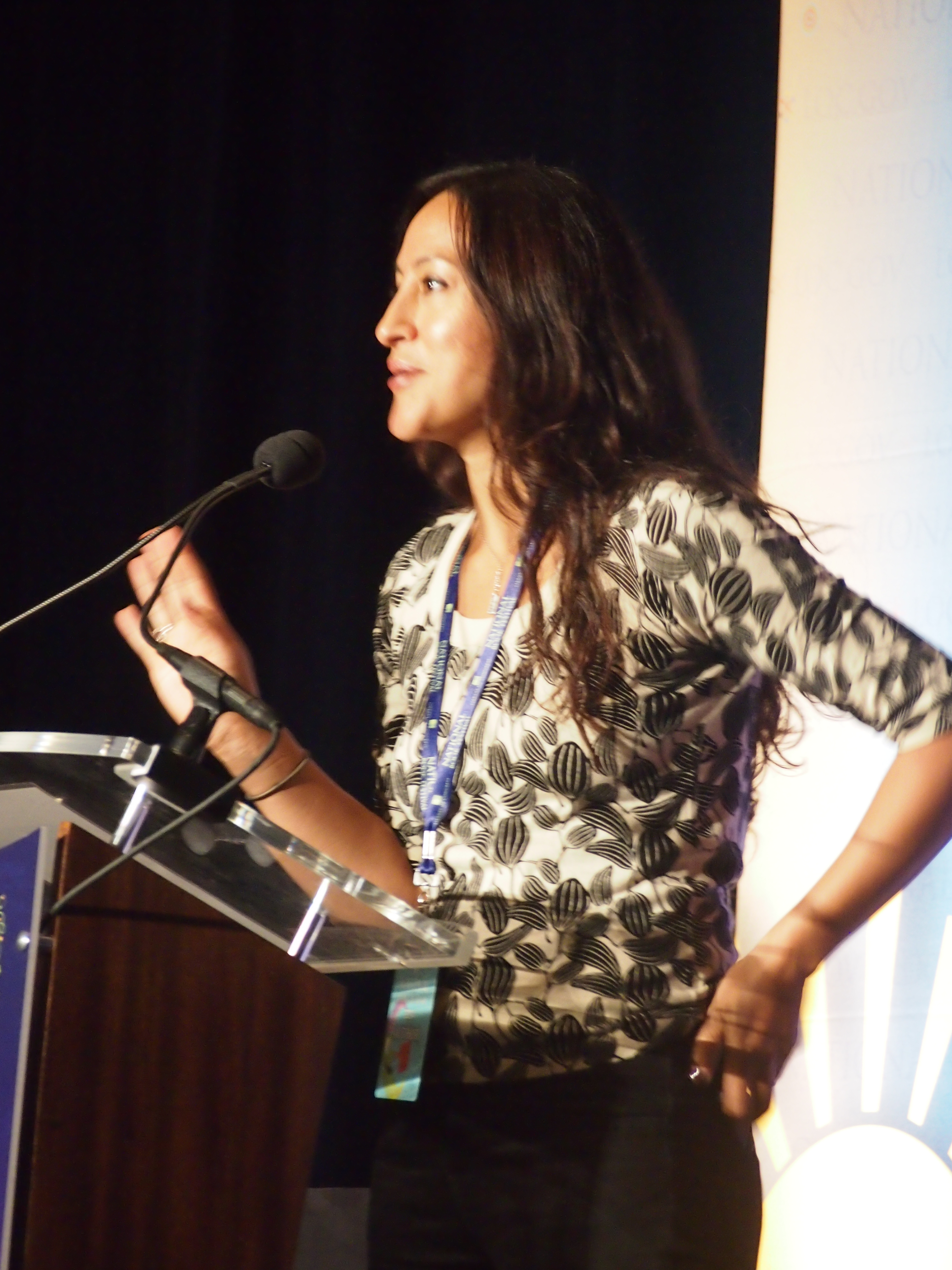
Venegas at the National Book Festival, 2014

Maria Venegas is an American writer, who was born in Mexico. She immigrated to the United States at the age of four. She graduated from Hunter College with an MFA in creative writing, where she was a 2007 Hertog Fellow for Frank McCourt. In 2015, she was a Hertog Fellowship mentor to a Hunter College MFA student. She lives in New York City.

Her memoir Bulletproof Vest received positive reviews from The New York Times, NPR, and the Chicago Tribune.

== Works ==
- Bulletproof Vest: The Ballad of an Outlaw and His Daughter (2014)

She has also written short stories which have appeared in Granta, The Guardian, and Ploughshares.
