= Michael Wex =

Canadian writer

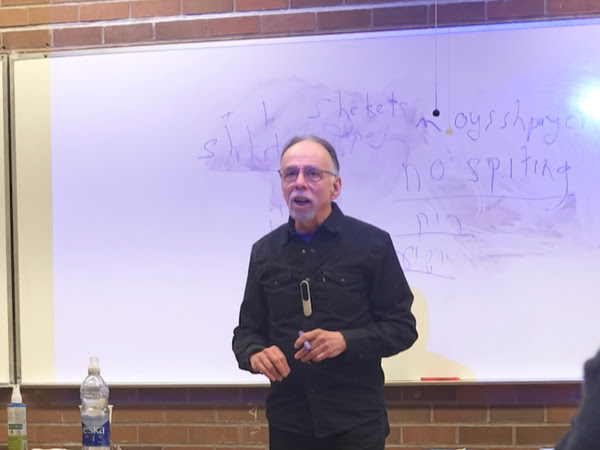
- Michael Wex at Seattle Yiddish Fest 2024
- Born: September 12, 1954 (age 71)
- Writing career
- Subject: Yiddish
- Notable work: Born to Kvetch
- Website: michaelwex.com

Michael Wex (born September 12, 1954) is a Canadian novelist, playwright, translator, lecturer, performer, and author of books on language and literature. His specialty is Yiddish and his book Born to Kvetch was a surprise bestseller in 2005. Wex lives in Toronto.

Wex was born in Lethbridge, Alberta, Canada to a family of descendants of Rebbes of Ciechanów and Stryków. He has taught at the University of Toronto and the University of Michigan.

Recipient of the Adrienne Cooper Dreaming in Yiddish Award.

== Works ==
- The Frumkiss Family Business. Toronto: Knopf Canada, 2010. ISBN 978-0-307-39776-8
- How to Be a Mentsh (and Not a Shmuck). Harper, 2009. ISBN 978-0-061-77111-8
- Just Say Nu: Yiddish for Every Occasion (When English Just Won't Do). New York: St. Martin's Press, 2007. ISBN 0-312-36462-8
- Born to Kvetch: Yiddish Language And Culture in All Its Moods. Publisher: St. Martin's Press (September 1, 2005). ISBN 0-312-30741-1
- Born to Kvetch (Audio CD). ISBN 0-06-113122-9
- Shlepping the Exile, 1993, ISBN 0-88962-542-5
- The Adventures of Micah Mushmelon, Boy Talmudist. 2007.
- Die Abenteuer des Micah Mushmelon, kindlicher Talmudist (dt. von Heiko Lehmann, Wagenbach 2005)
- Classic Yiddish Stories of S.Y. Abramovitsh, Sholem Aleichem, and I.L. Peretz. (Michael Wex, translator) 2004. ISBN 0-8156-0760-1
- The Wishing-Ring by S.Y. Abramovitsh (Michael Wex, translator). 2003. ISBN 0-8156-3035-2
- God in Paris (performance)
- Sex in Yiddish (performance)
- Judenverwolkung, or Meshiekh's Tsaytn (performance)
- I Just Want to Jewify (The Yiddish Revenge on Wagner) (performance)
- Rhapsody in Schmaltz: Yiddish Food and Why We Can't Stop Eating It
