= Soviet Jews in the United States =

Ethnic group in the United States

Soviet Jews in America or American Soviet Jews are Jews from the former Soviet Union that have immigrated to the United States. The group consists of people that are Jewish by religion, ethnicity, culture, or nationality, that have been influenced by their collective experiences in the Soviet Union. In the 1960s, there were around 2.3 million Jews in the Soviet Union, as ethnicity was recorded in the census. Jews in the Soviet Union were mostly Ashkenazi, and immigrated in waves starting in the 1960s, with over 200,000 leaving in the 1970s. As of 2005, over 500,000 Jews had left the former Soviet Union for the United States.

American Soviet Jews are often covered by the blanket term, "Russian-speaking Jews" (the term establishes a language-based group identity), and are a self-selecting group, due to the barriers that people leaving the Soviet Union had to face. Oftentimes, Soviet immigrants struggle with the abundance of choices that they can make in America, but after learning the language, have been shown to be as well-adjusted as other immigrant groups.

== Activism ==
Various grassroots activist groups emerged in America in the 60s to lobby for Soviet Jewish migration to the United States. The idea was to apply enough pressure to pry open the iron curtain, and have the resources to settle and assimilate Soviet Jews in the United States.

One campaign included making direct contact with Soviet Jews, by mail, was started in Cleveland. Attempts to contact refuseniks were thwarted by the Soviet state. However, the addresses of eight Soviet synagogues were published, and in a campaign publicized by American Jewish newspapers, over 50,000 cards were sent to synagogues in the USSR.

=== Union of Councils for Soviet Jews and Student Struggle for Soviet Jewry (SSSJ) ===
The Cleveland Council on Soviet Anti-Semitism, founded in 1963, was the first North American grassroots organization to advocate for Soviet Jews. In 1964 the Student Struggle for Soviet Jewry was founded at Columbia University. By 1970 six independent Soviet Jewry advocacy organizations joined to found the Union of Councils for Soviet Jews. Through their utilization of protests, information dissemination, and lobbying, these groups pressured the Kremlin to allow for the release of refuseniks, and Jews seeking to escape the USSR. Biblical phrases such as "Let my people go," dominated the activism, with American Jewish community playing a large role in disseminating and spreading information about the stories of Russian Jews.

=== Hebrew Immigrant Aid Society (HIAS) ===
In 1989, the HIAS assisted 36,114 Jewish refugees from the Soviet Union. A majority of these were from the Ukrainian, Russian, Byelorussian, and Uzbek republics. These consisted of more than 11,000 family units, with over 60% having "Professionals, Engineers/Scientists, Technicians, or White Collar" as their former occupation.

== Cultural and linguistic adjustment ==
Soviet Jews tended to be more agnostic than their American counterparts, but upon arrival to the United States, were accosted by a wide variety of Jewish institutions. While Jewishness in the Soviet Union was a national and ethnic identity, in America it became a cultural and religious one.Some immigrants had a hard time accepting their Jewish identity due to the antisemitism and abuse they had experienced in the Soviet Union, causing their integration into Jewish life in America to take time. They also had had little previous knowledge of their Jewishness beforehand, as well as no good association with that part of their identity. Many joined Reform and Conservative congregations, as a means of belonging to a community that barely existed in their previous country. Children and teens could now be enrolled in Yeshivas and Jewish summer and day camps, and have bar and bat mitzvahs, reinforcing Jewish identity. n

The range of options in American society—the variety of consumer goods, labor market mobility, and pluralism that exists within American Jewish communities at first contributes to a sense of being "uprooted". Learning English is cited to be the hardest part of the adjustment process, but is the key to higher earnings and occupational status. With linguistic improvement, comes the transformation of relevant skills, however, those with professional skills often do not achieve the fluency needed to practice in America, causing less-skilled professional jobs to be a long-term solution.

A survey conducted on 310 of Russian Jewish households in New York found that 84% used Russian in their homes when growing up, promoting the retention of Soviet popular culture and affecting the languages spoken in adulthood.

Jews immigrated in much larger proportions from Ukraine than Russia, altering the characteristics and types of communities that were formed in the U.S.

=== Communities ===
Soviet Jewish migration consisted of several waves, the main one in the late 1980s. Now, Jews born in the Soviet Union account for 5% of the American Jewish population. 1980 Census data shows that 98.6% of Soviet Jews lived in a Standard Metropolitan Statistical Area, with 36% concentrated in the New York SMSA, or 300,000.

This new class of Jews brought with them their own culture and views, which subsequently had a unique effect on their values and contributions to American Society. The unique circumstances of the Jewish "exodus" from the USSR has led to a tendency with regards to political leanings, as well. Going through communism in a totalitarian regime, has caused Russian Jews to be more conservative and less religious than their American counterparts.

==== Brighton Beach ====
Located in the southern-most part of Brooklyn, Brighton Beach, or "Little Odessa" as it has come to be known, is the most dramatic example of a "Russified" neighborhood (despite the fact that Odesa is a city in Ukraine).

=== Labor markets ===
As a continuation of the norms of the Soviet Union, Soviet Jews place an abundance of value on occupational status for themselves and their descendants. Lacking an understanding of American social mobility, the group views first jobs as a measure of self-worth and prestige, over purely monetary compensation.

==== Brain drain ====
Despite Jews constituting 0.69% of the Soviet population in 1975, they accounted for 8.8% of all scientists, and 14% of all scientists with a Doctor rank (PhD equivalent). Nonetheless, Jews were systemically discriminated against and quotas were instituted to prevent them from participating in sensitive research, because they were deemed "security risks". The exodus of Jewish intellectuals form the Soviet Union (starting in the 60s) foreshadowed a large scale intellectual migration. This was so loathed by Soviet officials that a diploma tax was instituted on those who wanted to emigrate.
