= A Lady's Guide to Fortune-Hunting =

2022 novel by Sophia Irwin

- Author: Sophie Irwin
- Language: English
- Genre: Regency romance
- Publisher: Pamela Dorman/Viking
- Publication date: 12 July 2022
- Publication place: United Kingdom
- ISBN: 0735245053
- OCLC: 1295242974
- Followed by: A Lady's Guide to Scandal

A Lady's Guide to Fortune-Hunting is a regency romance novel by Sophie Irwin. Her debut novel, it follows Kitty Talbot, an impoverished young woman in 1810s England with four younger sisters, as she attempts to marry her way into fortune to pay off her family's debts.

== Reception ==
Kirkus Reviews called it a "sweet Regency debut for contemporary fans of classic romance." Susan Maguire of the Booklist called it a "delicious historical rom-com in the vein of Martha Waters and Bridgerton without the smooching." Elizabeth Gabriel of the Library Journal called it a "fine historical romance full of wit and banter" and recommended it as a "read-alike" to Mimi Matthews' The Siren of Sussex and Julia Quinn's Bridgerton series. Ong Sor Fern of The Straits Times gave the novel a 4 out of 5 rating and called it "decadently pleasurable as a cream tea with all the trimmings", a "smart and shockingly entertaining update of the genre" and the "perfect summer beach read". Jasmina Svenne of the Historical Novels Review opined that while Irwin "seems a little shaky on Regency etiquette", she "thoroughly enjoyed this light-hearted romp".
