= Virginia Boucher =

Former librarian

Virginia Boucher (born 1929, died 2025) was a former librarian and professor emerita at University of Colorado Boulder. She was a pioneer in the field of interlibrary loans. The annual Virginia Boucher/OCLC Distinguished ILL Librarian Award, delivered by the American Library Association (ALA) and OCLC to librarians for "outstanding professional achievement, leadership and contributions to ILL and document delivery through publication of significant professional literature, participation in professional associations, and/or innovative approaches to practice in individual libraries," was established in her honor in 2000.

== Personal life ==
Virginia Boucher was born in 1929 and raised in Michigan. She had chosen a career as a librarian by the age of 12, with the encouragement of her mother and teachers. She married her husband Stanley Boucher at age 21. She received a master's degree in Library Science from the University of Michigan.

The American Alpine Club (ACC) honored her as an unsung hero in its history. She was chair of its library committee and received the 2005 Angelo Heilprin citation from the AAC for exemplary service to the Club.

Boucher had two children, Julie J. Boucher (1963–1996) and Eric Boucher, also known as Jello Biafra, vocalist of the punk band Dead Kennedys. Boucher's husband Stanley died in 2013.

== Professional life ==
Boucher's first professional library position was at University of Colorado Boulder, where she would return in later years. She also worked at the pharmaceutical library of Cutter Laboratories, where she met Peg Uridge, the inventor of the four-part interlibrary loan form; the Western Interstate Commission for Higher Education; Boulder Public Library, where she created the municipal government reference center; and Colorado State Library.

Boucher began as a librarian in the interlibrary loan department of the library of University of Colorado Boulder in 1967. At this time, there were few processes in place for facilitating interlibrary loans, and access to interlibrary loans was restricted to academic researchers only. In 1969, Boucher began leading training workshops for interlibrary loan librarians, and created the Colorado Interlibrary Loan Conference (now known as the Colorado Resource Sharing Conference), which has been held continuously since 1970. In 1984, her book InterLibrary Loan Practices Handbook, a foundational text in the field of interlibrary loans.

Boucher also served on eleven professional committees, including the OCLC Interlibrary Loan Committee and the International Federation of Library Associations and Institutions (IFLA) Document Delivery and Interlibrary Loan Committee. She served as President of the References and Adult Services Division of the American Library Association during the 1977–1978 term.

== Death ==
Boucher died at her home on March 9, 2025. She was 95 years old.
