= In the Land of Armadillos =

Short story collection by Helen Maryles Shankman

- First edition
- Author: Helen Maryles Shankman
- Language: English
- Publication place: United States

In the Land of Armadillos is a collection of short stories set during the Holocaust of World War II, written by Helen Maryles Shankman, and published by Scribner in 2016.

== Author biography ==
Helen Maryles Shankman, currently lives in New Jersey with her husband and four children. But her original plan was to move to New York and attend art school there. Shortly after, she realized that her true passion wasn't art, but writing. She has been nominated for two Pushcart Prizes, was a finalist in Narrative Magazine's Story Contest, and earned an Honorable Mention in Glimmer Train's Short Story Award for New Writers Competition. Her stories have appeared in: The Kenyon Review, Cream City Review, Gargoyle, Grift, 2 Bridges Review, Danse Macabre, and JewishFiction.net. Shankman was a finalist in Narrative Magazine's Winter Story Contest and earned an Honorable Mention in Glimmer Train's Short Story Award for New Writers competition.

== Main characters ==
Toby: Jewish painter who has lost all spirit and will to live after witnessing the slaughter of his brethren and finding out his sister has died. His passions for life and art have both fallen to the level of trivialities during the war.

Max Haas: German SS officer. He is fully aware of the lives he takes, yet he only admits to experiencing slight emotions when he kills others. He doesn't truly seem attached to anyone with the exception of Tobias Rey.

Willy Reinhart: German officer who had compassion for Jews. He is known all throughout Poland for protecting "his Jews." Reinhart has many Jewish friends: Haskel Soroka, the saddlemaker, becomes one of Reinhart's most trusted confidants.

Fraulein Rozycki: Toby's lover before the war.

Adela:Max's maid who Toby has a crush on.

Messiah:Also known as Shua Tzedek. He is said to be the Messiah of the Jewish people. However when he finally appears to help his oppressed people, he says that he has quit. Later on Shua helps Jewish people escape from SS officers by flying up into the air and throwing thunderbolts at the SS officers.

Reina: Jewish girl that Pavel is forced to look after. Also, the daughter of Haskel Soroka. She becomes friends with Pavel's dog Cezar, whom she names Fallada after a story that includes a talking horse.

Pavel: Russian potato farmer who hates Jews. His abhorrence of the Jewish leads him to frequently sell out anyone he suspects of being a Jew in hopes that they will be arrested. However he is forcibly changed, when he is put in charge of caring for a little Jewish girl. His iron heart is crushed when he is made the victim by the very people he was helping. Pavel is tough on the outside, but very caring on the inside.

Hersh and Shayna: Brother and sister who help a lost man. In charge of the mill and wheat farm after their father died during the first week of fighting in the war.

Yossel: lost man that gets helped by Hersh and Shayna. He thinks that he is a golem and Shayna is his rabbi. His real name is supposedly David Truno who is a man who miraculously survived a mass shooting.

Lukas Reinhart: Lukas is the grandson of Reinhart. His family is ashamed about Willy Reinhart's actions, so Lukas doesn't know much about his grandfather. He wishes to make up for these actions when he meets Julia and learn more about his grandfather

Julia Soroka: The granddaughter of the saddlemaker Haskel Soroka. She is hesitant about meeting with Lukas because of the relationship between their grandparents (Nazi officer and Polish Jew).

Stefan: The old man that was telling the priest his story in "They Were Like Family To Me". He is caught while hunting in the forest by some German soldiers and accidentally sells out the Singer family when he shows the German soldiers the tracks in the snow.

The Singer Family: Jewish friends of Stefan. They vanished from the ghetto they were placed in and were thought to have maybe either vanished into the forests or to live with friends or farmers.

Zosha: Zosha was like a sister to Zev. She saw Zev last before he ran away.

Zev: Zev was like a brother to Zosha. He struggled in school and would get into fights. He decides to run away and join the resistance (The Partizans).

Cezar: Pavel's dog. Befriends Reina when she comes and stays with them. Cezar can talk and tells Reina where and when to hide from the SS soldiers who show up at their house.

== Plot synopsis of each short story ==
=== In the Land Of Armadillos ===
The story of Maximilian Haas, a German SS commander, and Tobias Rey, a hired Jewish painter. Haas is the icy-hearted, self-proclaimed "General of the Jews" who wonders why he is able to kill so many without feeling anything. However when he encounters Tobias Rey, the illustrator of the book In the Land of Armadillos, he is somehow motivated to keep the depressed and faded painter alive. However, in this bloodstained world, Haas is ultimately unable to keep the poor man from being shot. For the first time, Max Haas, slaughterer of hundreds, feels the overwhelming sorrow of loss.

=== The Partizans ===
A short fantastical tale of Zasha and Zev. Zasha watches as her childhood friend runs from home to escape his parents. She meets him again later years later to discover he has joined a resistance force. Soon after their reunion, Zasha is caught and readied to be executed. Zev and the resistance fighters arrive to save the captured in the form of animals (Zev himself appears in the form of a wolf). Before Zev can save her though, Zasha is shot fatally in the throat.

=== The Messiah ===
The family and village of the narrator eagerly await the coming of a messiah to deliver their people to the promised land. Amazingly enough, a "messiah" of sorts appears to the family of the narrator. However when they prepare to depart, the messiah, Shua, declares tiredly that he wishes to quit. He follows the village as they are captured and taken to a camp, unremorsefully partaking in more human desires. Finally he offers to help the family of the narrator escape the grasp of the Germans, and to their amazement, he summons an explosion to kill a German patrol they have been caught by, before disappearing. Later the young narrator reflects on whether Shua was really a Messiah, or whether he was like the other fakes that came before him.

=== They Were Like Family to Me ===
The tale of an old man who, when he was a child, had become best friends with the Singer family and their child Sender. After the invasion of Poland, the Singer Family, as they were called disappeared mysteriously. Years later, the narrator (the old man) had gone to hunt in the forest and stumbled upon some animal tracks. Unfortunately for him he also stumbled upon a German patrol, which detained him immediately. Upon further investigation, however, they discovered that the narrator was not Jewish, so they apologised and let him go. Striking up small conversation with the patrol, the narrator revealed the animal tracks he had found earlier, which, to his horror turned out to be tracks of the Singer Family. The narrator then, to protect himself, is forced to capture and execute the Singers, including his lover and best friend Sender.

=== The Jew Hater ===
Pavel Walczak lost his wife Lidia and baby Kazimir during the Great War. He is a Jew-hater because he tells the German soldiers where Jews are hiding. At midnight one night, two Jewish Partizans came knocking on his door. Their camp had been ambushed and one of the men had been wounded. They knew Pavel had told the Germans where their camp was, but they came to leave a little Jewish girl named Reina, who had also been shot, with them so she would be safe from the SS soldiers. They wanted Pavel to clean the wound and take care of her for a few months. One of the partizans told Pavel before he left that if anything bad happened to the little girl that Arno the Hammer was going to find him and burn his house down with him in it. Pavel takes a liking to the girl and they become very attached. At the end of the chapter, Haskel Soroka, Reina's father, comes back and takes Reina home with him.

=== The Golem of Zukow ===
This story takes us into the lives of Hersh and Shayna, who are brother and sister. They inherited their father's wheat farm when he was killed in the war. One day a man named Yossel showed up naked at their doorstep. Hersh explains the story of the Golem of Prague and that the man thinks he is the Golem and that makes Shayna his rabbi. They take him in and Hersh puts the Shema, the prayers that are said to be how the rabbi brought him to life, in his jacket's inner pocket. Later on, all the Jews in Lublinske were gathered up by German soldiers and being taken into the Parczew Forest and where they would probably be killed. Yossel decides to attack the Germans and the jews run away during this encounter. Shayna decides they should come back and check on Yossel and we find the dismembered bodies of the German soldiers and Yossel alive near the riverbank. Yossel has a dozen bullet wounds, some bayonet stab wounds, and was visibly in a lot of pain. Yossel asks Shayna to remove the Shema because that would signify him completing his mission and he would be able to die. Shayna does this and Yossel goes still and dies. Later we find out Yossel is said to be David Truno, who survived a mass shooting, went crazy and arrived at Shayna and Hersh's doorstep.

=== A Decent Man ===
Willy Reinhart is well respected in his community by Germans and Jews alike because of his kind nature. He feels no superiority to Jewish people like most other Germans and views them as equal to himself. When his Polish assistant, Drogalski, is buried alive by Hahnemeier after he promised to keep him safe, Reinhart decides to try to save everyone he can from being killed. He takes in many of the local Jews to stay in his castle on the edge of the woods where they can be safe. Despite his good nature, Reinhart takes advantage of some privileges he has as a German official in German-occupied Poland. At the end of the section, German police come to Reinhart's home to kill the Jews with him. After the first family is taken out of sight and shot, the rest of the Jews attempt to run away, but are only gunned down in a massacre by the surrounding German officers. At the end of the section, he is shot by a Russian officer.

=== New York City, 1989 ===
This chapter begins from the perspective of a young girl named Julia Soroka, the granddaughter of the saddlemaker Haskel Soroka. She arranges a meeting with Lukas, a grandson of Reinhart, in New York City. They tell each other what their family members have told them about their ancestors in an awkward conversation, and she gives Lukas Reinhart's diary. At the very end, they decide to go get a cup of coffee and continue their conversation. The novel ends in a way that we may think Julia and Lukas may develop a friendship.
