= Kolce =

- Village
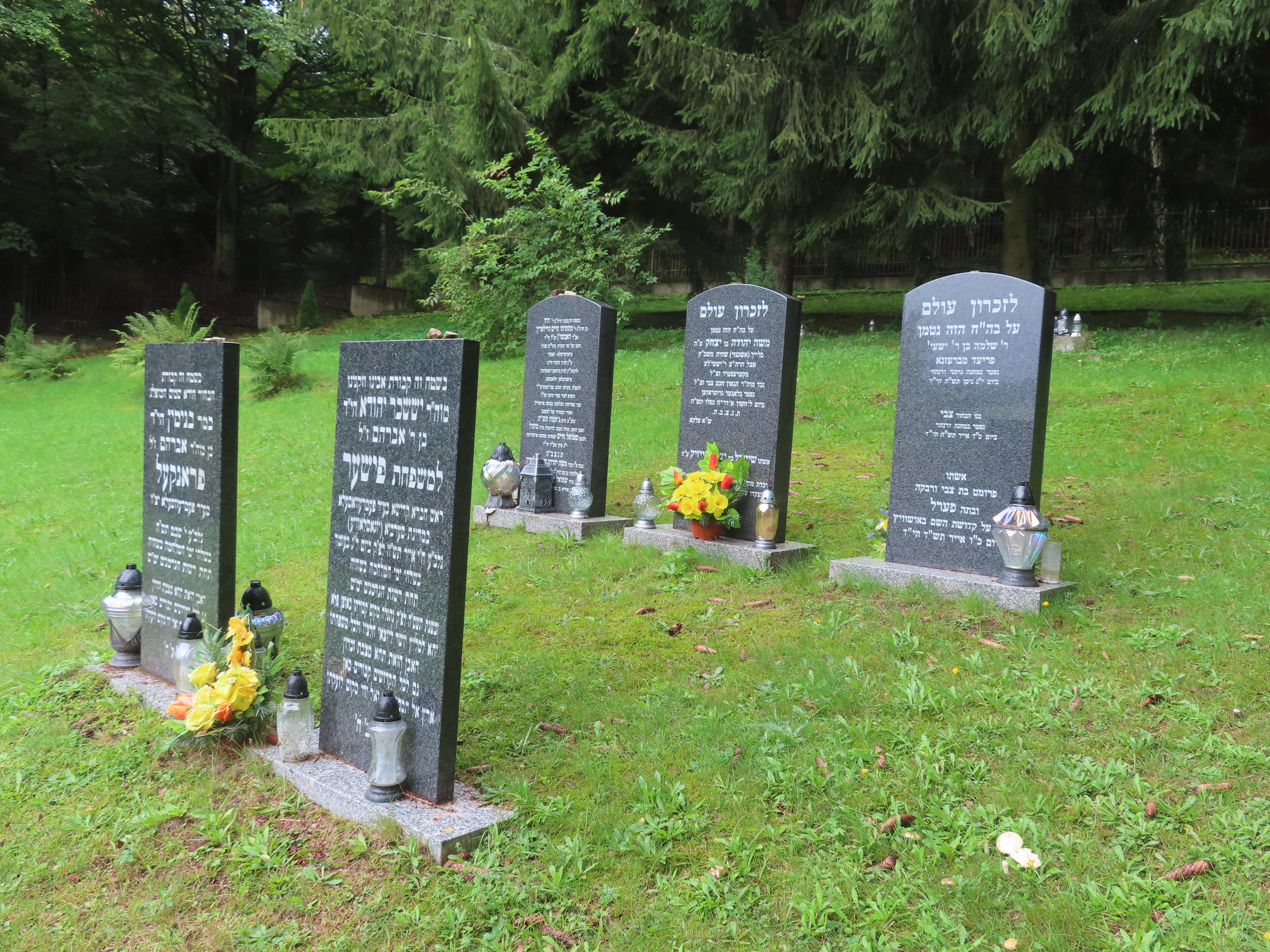
- Victims of fascism cemetery

- Location within Poland
- Coordinates: 50°39′53″N 16°23′49″E
- Country: Poland
- Voivodeship: Lower Silesian
- County: Wałbrzych
- Gmina: Głuszyca

Kolce ([ˈkɔlt͡sɛ]) is a village in the administrative district of Gmina Głuszyca, within Wałbrzych County, Lower Silesian Voivodeship, in south-western Poland, close to the Czech border.
