= Nathan Englander =

American short story writer and novelist

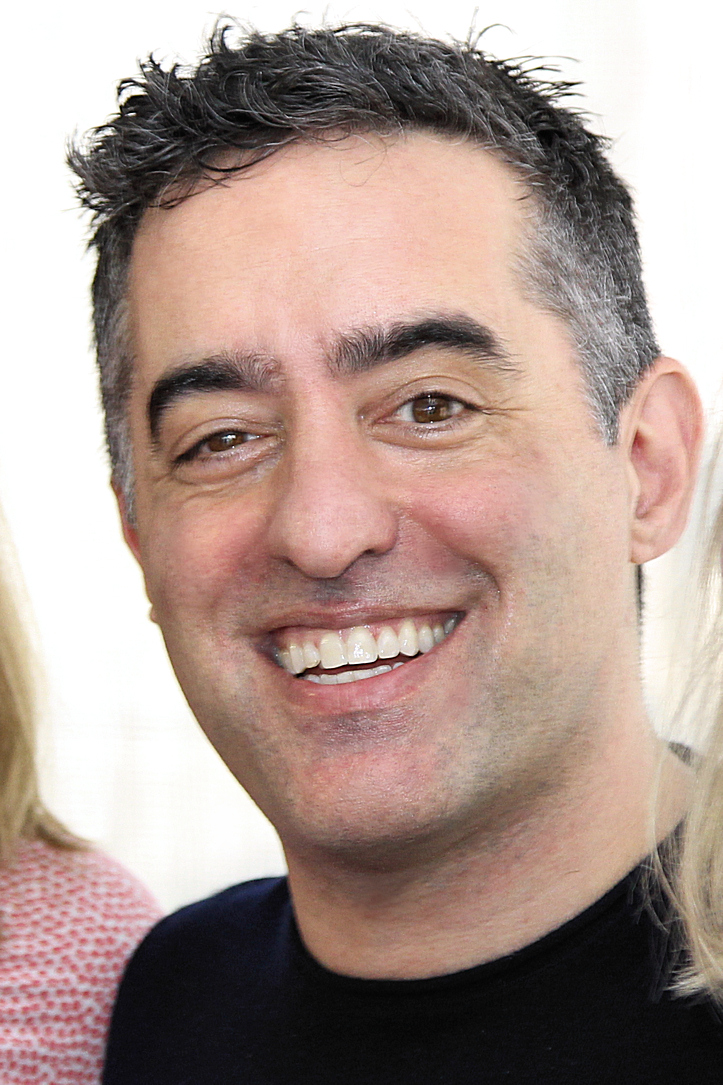
- Englander at the 2017 Texas Book Festival
- Born: 1970 (age 55–56); West Hempstead, New York, U.S.
- Education: Binghamton University (BA); University of Iowa (MFA)
- Writing career
- Genres: short story, novel
- Website: nathanenglander.com

Nathan Englander (born 1970) is an American short story writer and novelist. His debut short story collection, For the Relief of Unbearable Urges, was published by Alfred A. Knopf, in 1999. His second collection, What We Talk About When We Talk About Anne Frank, won the 2012 Frank O'Connor International Short Story Award and was a finalist for the Pulitzer Prize.

== Biography ==
Nathan Englander was born in West Hempstead on Long Island, New York, and grew up there as part of the Orthodox Jewish community. He attended the Hebrew Academy of Nassau County for high school and graduated from the State University of New York at Binghamton and the Iowa Writers' Workshop at the University of Iowa. In the mid-1990s, he moved to Israel, where he lived for five years.

Englander lives in Toronto, Ontario, with his wife Rachel, and children Olivia and Sammy. He formerly lived in Brooklyn, New York, and Madison, Wisconsin. He taught fiction as a part of CUNY Hunter College's Master of Fine Arts Program in Creative Writing and in the MFA program at New York University.

== Literary career ==
Since the publication of For the Relief of Unbearable Urges, Englander has received a Guggenheim Fellowship, the Bard Fiction Prize, and a fellowship at the Dorothy and Lewis B. Cullman Center for Scholars and Writers at the New York Public Library. Four of his short stories have appeared in editions of The Best American Short Stories: "The Gilgul of Park Avenue" appeared in the 2000 edition, with guest editor E.L. Doctorow, "How We Avenged the Blums" appeared in the 2006 edition, guest edited by Ann Patchett, "Free Fruit for Young Widows" appeared in the 2011 edition, guest edited by Geraldine Brooks, and "What We Talk About When We Talk About Anne Frank" appeared in the 2012 edition, guest edited by Tom Perrotta. Another story in the collection, "The Twenty-Seventh Man," debuted as a play in November, 2012, the subject of a radio program featuring audio of a reading by actor Michael Stuhlbarg.

The Ministry of Special Cases, Englander's follow-up to his debut collection, was released on April 24, 2007. The novel is set in 1976 in Buenos Aires during Argentina's "Dirty War" and has been described as "an impeccably paced, historically accurate novel which is alternatively side-splitting and frighteningly macabre." Englander has said of his novel: "I resisted calling it a political book, in that it wasn’t my intent—that is, I had no corrupting (as I’d see it) preconceived position that I was pushing. There’s a lot of politics in my novel, because it’s central to the world of that novel."

Englander's third book, What We Talk About When We Talk About Anne Frank, a short story collection, was released on February 7, 2012. The title story was featured in the December 12, 2011 issue of The New Yorker, and the book won the 2012 Frank O'Connor International Short Story Award and was a finalist for the Pulitzer Prize for Fiction.

In 2017, Englander was announced as juror for the 2017 Scotiabank Giller Prize.

== Awards and critical acclaim ==
- 2000 - PEN/Malamud Award
- 2012 - Frank O'Connor International Short Story Award

== Published works ==
- For the Relief of Unbearable Urges. New York: Alfred A. Knopf 1999. ISBN 9780375404924, OCLC 245836139
- The Ministry of Special Cases New York: Alfred A. Knopf, 2007. ISBN 9780375404931, OCLC 938286689
- What We Talk About When We Talk About Anne Frank. New York: Alfred A. Knopf, 2012. ISBN 9780307958709, OCLC 782137235
- Dinner at the Center of the Earth. New York: Alfred A. Knopf, 2017. ISBN 9781524732738, OCLC 1002660851
- Kaddish.com. New York: Alfred A. Knopf, 2019. ISBN 9781524732752, OCLC 1084694484
