= Brodart =

Library-servicing company

Brodart Company
- Type: Private
- Industry: library supplies
- Founded: Newark, New Jersey 1939 (founded as Library Service. Company name changed to Brodart in 1946)
- Founder: Arthur Brody
- Headquarters: Williamsport, Pennsylvania
- Products: book jackets, library products, furniture, support, training, and consulting services
- Revenue: $170.8 million (2005)
- Website: www.brodart.com

Brodart Company is an American products and services company that serves libraries. Brodart is made up of three divisions: Books & Automation, Contract Library Furniture, and Supplies & Furnishings.

== History ==
Brodart was established as Library Service in 1939, when Columbia University Electrical Engineering student Arthur Brody, the son of pharmacy owners and owners of the Bro-Delle Book Shoppe in Newark, New Jersey, invented the plastic book jacket. Brody washed the emulsion off some film and folded it around his books for added protection. The covers are used to protect the original paper jackets of books.

In 1946, the company's name was changed to Bro-Dart (later revised to Brodart).

The company grew, and in 1959 Brodart began manufacturing furniture. Brodart's furniture is sold to schools, universities, and libraries internationally.

In the 1950s Brodart expanded into book distribution. Many books are offered to libraries already cataloged.

Starting in about 1980, Bro-Dart expanded into the area of stationery stores (now commonly called office-supply stores) and book stores. It acquired the California stores of the Oregon-based J. K. Gill Company in the first half of 1980, and in September 1980 acquired the entire J. K. Gill company, which had 36 stores and about 500 employees in four western states. In 1982, Bro-Dart Industries (BDI Investment, Inc.) acquired Burrows, an Ohio chain of book- and office-supply stores, which was based in Cleveland and had 45 stores in 1979 and about $18 million in annual sales. (The company was known as Burrows Brothers before 1944 and after 1988.) By mid-1987, the number of Burrows stores had declined to 29, and the last stores closed in 1992. The J. K. Gill chain continued in operation (as a Brodart subsidiary), but its revenue also fell, in the face of competition from national chains, and the last Gill's stores closed in early 1999.

== Divisions ==
- The Books & Automation Division supplies cataloged and processed books. Brodart offers online tools, bibliographic services, and consulting to libraries. Customers select from English and Spanish titles, as well as audio and video products.
- The Contract Furniture Division manufactures wooden furniture specified to end-user needs.
- The Supplies & Furnishings Division offers library supplies and products. The Brodart Supply Catalog offers thousands of items.

== Appearance on "Three Wishes" television show ==
In 2005, Brodart was featured in an episode of the NBC television show Three Wishes. The show outlined a young girl suffering from cerebral palsy who had a wish to bring a library to her small Ohio town. Brodart endorsed the show and created a library for the town.
