= List of journalism awards =

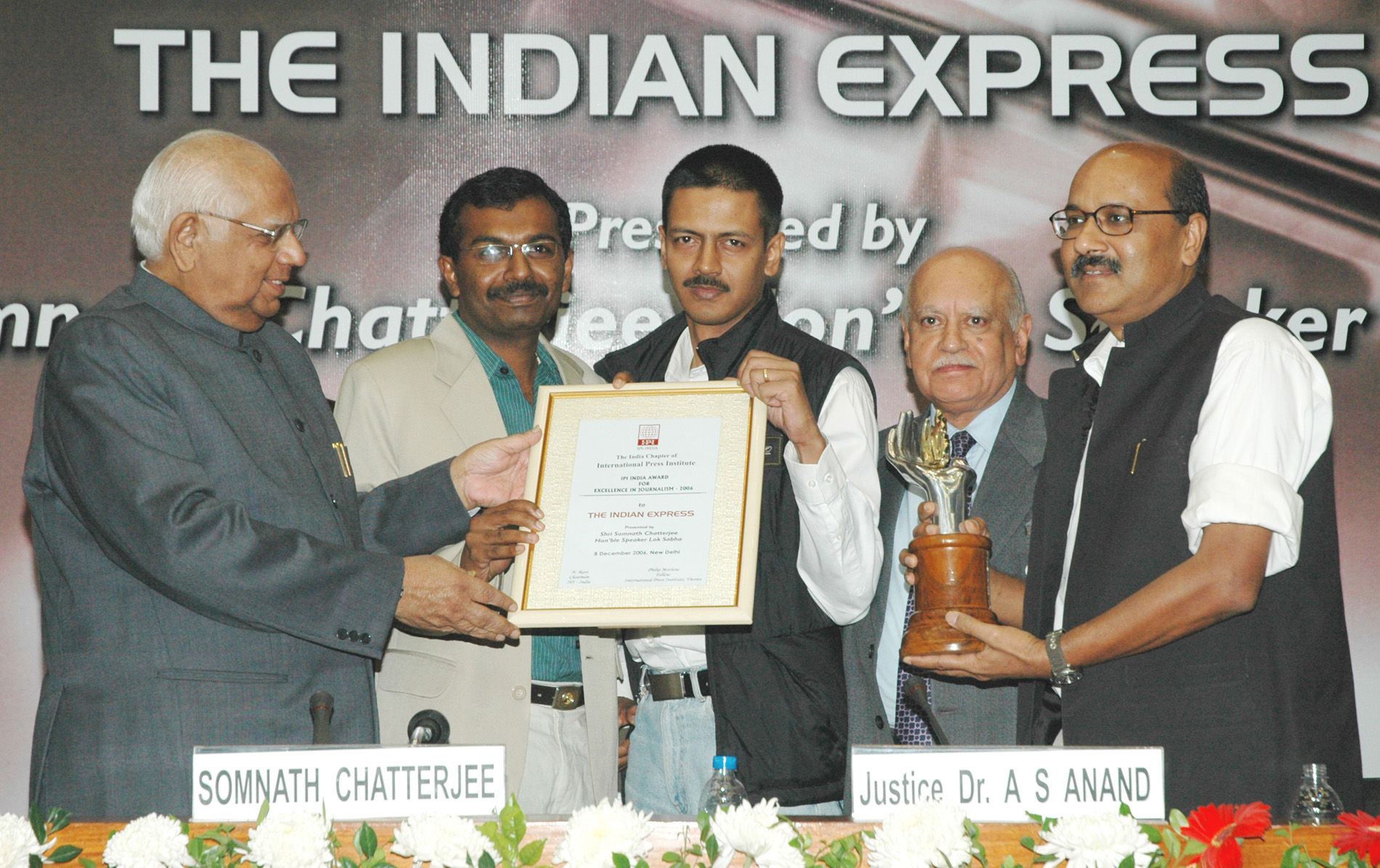
The Speaker, Lok Sabha, Shri Somnath Chatterjee, presenting Excellence in Journalism - 2006 Award to The Indian Express, in 2006

This list of journalism awards is an index to articles about notable awards for journalism. It is organized by the region and country of the organization that sponsors the award, although some awards are not limited to one country.

== International ==
- The Elizabeth Neuffer Memorial Prize
- One World Media Awards
- The Prince Albert II of Monaco and UNCA Global Prize
- Online Journalism Awards, administered by Online News Association
- Fetisov Journalism Awards
- UNESCO/Guillermo Cano World Press Freedom Prize
- World Association of Newspapers' Golden Pen of Freedom Award
- Premio Gabriel García Márquez, administered by Fundación Gabo

== Africa ==
- Namibia: Editors' Forum of Namibia Journalism Awards
- Namibia: One Economy Foundation Media Summit and Awards
- Nigeria : Nigerian Academy of Science Media Awards
- South Africa : Nat Nakasa Award for Media Integrity
- South Africa : Taco Kuiper Award for Investigative Journalism

== Americas ==
=== Canada ===
- Canadian Association of Journalists Awards
- Charles Lynch Award
- Critics and Awards Program for High School Students
- Yves Fortier Earth Science Journalism Award
- Gordon Sinclair Award
- Jack Graney Award
- Jack Webster Awards
- Michener Award
- National Media Awards Foundation
- National Newspaper Awards
- Olivar-Asselin Award
- Radio Television Digital News Association (RTDNA) Canada Awards

=== Latin America ===
- Brazil : Esso Journalism Award (discontinued since 2016)
- Brazil : Vladimir Herzog Award
- Chile : Lenka Franulic Award
- Chile : National Prize for Journalism
- Mexico: Premio Nacional de Periodismo 'José Joaquín Fernández de Lizardi'
- Ecuador : Jorge Mantilla Ortega Prize
- Uruguay : Marcelo Jelen Award

== Asia ==
- Bangladesh : Babisas Award
- Hong Kong : Hong Kong Human Rights Press Awards
- India : Bharatendu Harishchandra Awards
- India : Chameli Devi Jain Award for Outstanding Women Mediapersons
- India : National Award for Excellence in Journalism
  - Raja Ram Mohan Roy Award
- India : Rainbow Awards
  - Feature of the Year
  - Op-Ed of the Year
- India : Ramnath Goenka Excellence in Journalism Awards
- India : Siva Prasad Barooah National Award
- Israel : Sokolov Award
- Japan : Editors' Choice Magazine Journalism Award
- Pakistan : Agahi Award
- Pakistan : Pride of the Nation Gold Medal Awards
- Philippines : National Schools Press Conference
- Philippines : Ramon Magsaysay Award
- Thailand : Sriburapha Award
- Turkey : Metin Göktepe Journalism Awards
- Turkey : Sedat Simavi Journalism Award
- UAE : Arab Journalism Award

== Europe ==
- Europe : European Initiative Prize
- Europe : European Newspaper Award
- Europe : European Press Prize
- Europe : Lorenzo Natali Journalism Prize
- Croatia : Otokar Keršovani Prize
- Denmark : Cavling Prize
- France : Albert Londres Prize
- France : Bayeux-Calvados Awards for war correspondents
- Ireland : National Student Media Awards
- Italy : Ischia International Journalism Award
- Italy : Premiolino
- Netherlands : Anne Vondeling prize
- Netherlands : Pop Media Award
- Norway : International Reporter
- Norway : Narvesen Prize
- Norway : SKUP Award
- Poland : Golden Pear
- Spain : Ortega y Gasset Awards
- Spain :Premios rey de España awards
- Sweden : Guldspaden
- Sweden : Per Wendel Award
- Sweden : Stora Journalistpriset
- Sweden : Swedish Publicists' Association
- Sweden : WASH Media Award
- Sweden : Åke Blomström Award
- Turkey : Istanbul Photo Awards

=== Germany ===
- Axel-Springer-Preis
- Ernst-Schneider-Preis
- Felix-Rexhausen Award
- Gerhard Löwenthal Prize
- Hanns Joachim Friedrichs Award
- Lettre Ulysses Award
- The BOBs (weblog award)
- Theodor Wolff Prize
- Wächterpreis der Tagespresse

== Oceania ==
=== Australia ===
- Arthur Lovekin Prize in Journalism
- Eureka Prizes
- Graham Perkin Australian Journalist of the Year Award
- IT Journalism Awards
- John Douglas Pringle Award
- The Ledger Awards
- Multicultural and Indigenous Media Awards
- Pascall Prize
- Queensland Media Awards
- Sport Australia Media Awards
- Stanley Award
- WA Media Awards
- Walkley Awards
  - Gold Walkley
  - Nikon-Walkley Australian Press Photographer of the Year
  - Walkley Award for Broadcast Interviewing
  - Walkley Award for Journalism Leadership
  - Walkley Award for Most Outstanding Contribution to Journalism
- Young Australian Journalist of the Year (defunct)

== Photojournalism ==
- Atrium Award
- Democracy Photo Challenge
- Gruner + Jahr
- Local Testimony
- Pictures of the Year International
- Prix Nadar
- Pulitzer Prize for Breaking News Photography
- Pulitzer Prize for Feature Photography
- Pulitzer Prize for Photography
- Robert Capa Gold Medal
- Visa pour l'Image
- W. Eugene Smith Memorial Fund
- Premios Rey de españa

== See also ==
- Lists of awards
- List of science communication awards
- List of sports journalism awards
