= Erklärung 2018 =

Erklärung 2018 (English: Declaration 2018) was an open letter in Germany calling for intellectuals to provide support for protests against what the document describes as mass immigration into Germany. Initially published on the internet with 34 signatories from prominent German figures, the document was later turned into a formal petition to the Bundestag. The letter was notable to uniting formerly disparate political tendencies to legitimize right-wing and anti-immigrant sentiment in mainstream German politics.

== Ideology ==
With growing bewilderment we observe that Germany is being damaged by illegal mass immigration. We solidarize with those who peacefully demonstrate so that the rule of law can be restored at the borders of our country.

The publication of Erklärung 2018 on March 15, near the anniversary of the Thirty Years' War, resulted from the emergence of a new far-right intelligentsia in Germany involving the cooperation of multiple social constituencies including moderate conservatives, far-right intellectuals, and former leftists. The text of the declaration is simple and consists of two sentences. Translated from German these are: "With increasing alienation are we watching, how Germany is being damaged through illegal mass immigration. We show solidarity with those, who peacefully protest, so that the constitutional order at the borders of our country is restored".

Dresden publisher and Erklärung signatory Frank Böckelmann told Die Zeit that he and other Germans feared and wanted to prepare for a future in Germany where some parts of the country would be inhabited by a Muslim majority. One of the unusual features of the Erklärung was its bringing together of formerly disparate political tendencies into a new right wing movement.

One of the concepts motivating Erklärung 2018 is the notion that European civilization is in decline and being displaced by foreigners, in particular Muslims or Africans. This concept was explored in a 2018 German novel by Monika Maron called Munin or Chaos in the Head that has become a best-seller in Germany and is a favorite within its far-right intelligentsia. In the book, wealthy and educated inhabitants of Berlin's Prenzlauer Berg lose their belief in Germany culture and through self-hate open Germany to cultural invasion from the Middle East and Africa.

While arguments in Erklärung 2018 were marginal in German politics at the time of their publication, they have since become more mainstream.

== Opposition ==
The declaration was met by protest by the German Writer's Union, stating that Erklärung turned migrants into scapegoats for German insecurities, and that it tended to divide German society. The Erklärung was also opposed by Eva Leipprand of the Augsburg City Council and Green Party, and described in scathing terms by the Süddeutsche Zeitung.

The initial inclusion of Ellen Kositza, wife of far-right news publisher Götz Kubitschek, on the list of prominent signatories attracted negative publicity and led to debates among adherents of Erklärung 2018's cause. Kubitschek is a former member of the German Bundeswehr armed forces and has long been linked with far-right groups in Germany.

== Signatories ==
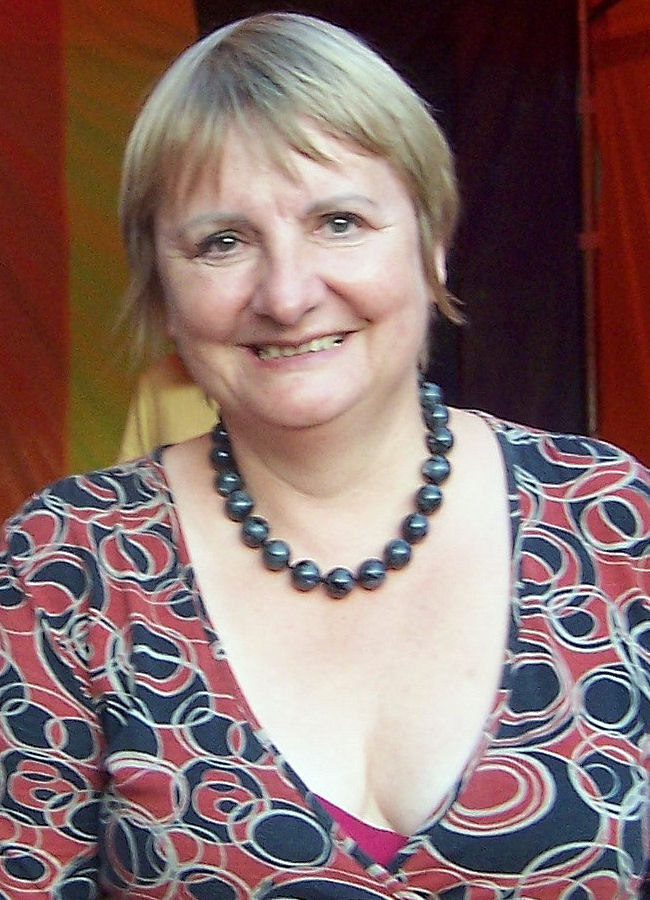
Vera Lengsfeld (2009)

Vera Lengsfeld, a CDU member and once an East German dissident and a member of the Green Party was a co-initiator of project producing Erklärung 2018. Other signatories to Erklärung include Uwe Tellkamp, SPD member and former banker Thilo Sarrazin, journalist Henryk M. Broder, and far-right figures Karheinz Weissman and Michael Klonovsky. Further prominent signatories include economist Max Otte, journalists Eva Herman and Dieter Stein, chief editor of the conservative magazine CATO Andreas Krause Landt, and publisher of the new right-wing Dresden magazine Tumult Frank Böckelmann.

== Petition ==
Though initially only signed by academics and prominent figures, the Erklärung became a petition to the German Bundestag. The petition demanded that constitutional control of borders against illegal entry into Germany be restored, and that a commission be created for the submission of proposals allowing the federal government to regain control of the country through migration policy. According to the Süddeutsche Zeitung, the petition is based upon false premises: that in 2018 mass immigration was occurring into Germany, that this immigration was illegal, and that the German government was encouraging it. Over 65,000 other Germans have signed the document.

== See also ==
- Pegida
- 2018 Chemnitz protests
