= Kondylis =

Kondylis is a surname. Notable people with the surname include:

- Costas Kondylis (1940–2018), American architect
- Georgios Kondylis (1878–1936), general and Prime Minister of Greece
- Panagiotis Kondylis (1943–1998), Greek philosopher, intellectual historian, translator and publications manager
