= Dousdebes =

Dousdebes or Dousdebés is a surname. Notable people with the surname include:

- Alfonso Reece Dousdebés (born 1955), Ecuadorian journalist, television reporter, and novelist
- Jeanette Dousdebes Rubio (born 1973), spouse of U.S. Senator Marco Rubio
