= Alfonso Reece Dousdebés =

Ecuadorian journalist and novelist

Alfonso Reece Dousdebés (Cotocollao, 1955) is an Ecuadorian journalist, TV reporter, and novelist.

He studied law and sociology at the Pontifical Catholic University of Ecuador.

He worked as a reporter since 1980 for the television channels Ecuavisa and Teleamazonas. In 1990 he decided to become a print journalist and has since worked for many leading journals of Ecuador, among which are 15 Días, Vistazo, SoHo, Mango and Mundo Diners. An article in the latter magazine earned him the Jorge Mantilla Ortega Prize from El Comercio in 1998.

He is currently a columnist for the newspaper El Universo.

== Novels ==
- 1996: El Numerario, finalist of the III Biennial Novel Contest (Ecuador).
- 2007: Morga
- 2013: Todas las aves
