= Golden Pear =

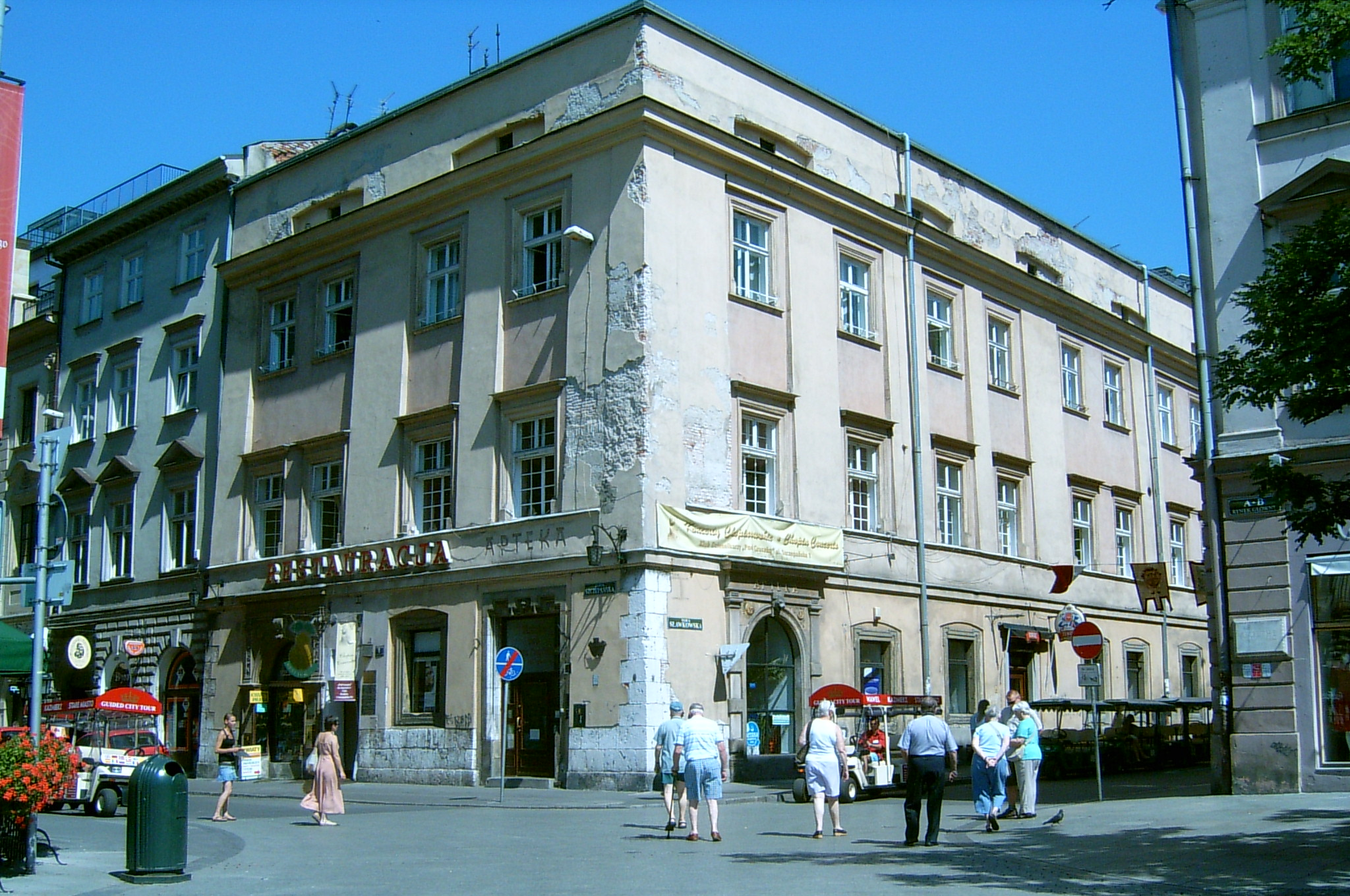
- Szczepańska 1, Kraków – "House under the pear"
- Awarded for: outstanding achievements in newspaper, television and radio journalism
- Country: Poland
- Presented by: The Association of Journalists of the Republic of Poland
- First award: 1989
- Website: Golden Pear

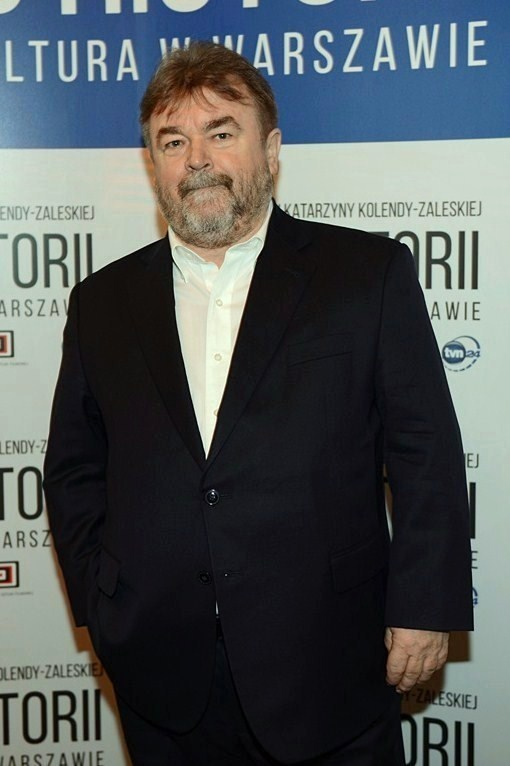
Edward Miszczak was awarded in 1997

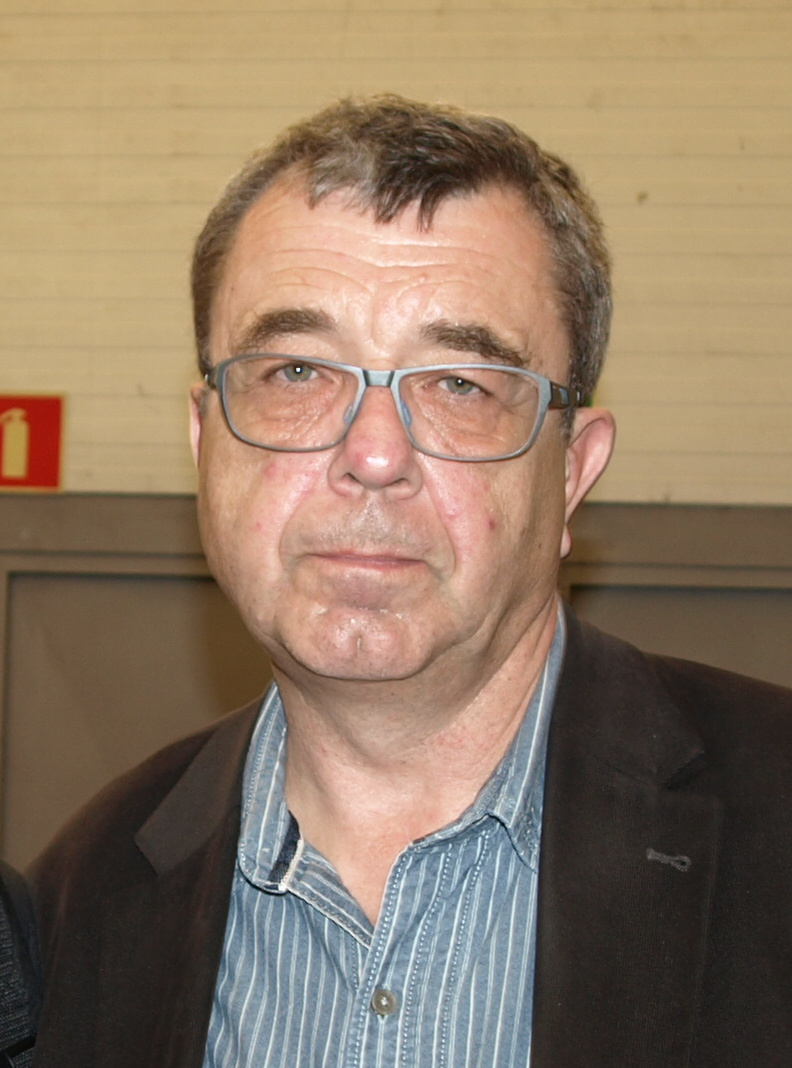
Grzegorz Miecugow was awarded in 2008

The Golden Pear (Polish: Złota Gruszka) is an award for outstanding achievements in newspaper, television and radio journalism in Poland. It was established in 1989 and is administered by The Association of Journalists of the Republic of Poland in Kraków.

Prizes are awarded yearly in three categories. The winners are awarded a statuettes of golden or green pears.

== Awarded ==
=== Golden Pear ===
- Leszek Konarski (1989)
- Henryk Cyganik (1990)
- Jan Adamczewski (1991)
- Zbigniew Bauer (1992)
- Ewa Kopcik (1995)
- Jerzy Piekarczyk (1996)
- Edward Miszczak (1997)
- Andrzej Mleczko (1998)
- Bruno Miecugow (1999)
- Wiesław Kolarz (2000)
- Jerzy Pałosz (2001)
- Grażyna Starzak (2002)
- Marek Bartosik (2003)
- Krzysztof Krzyżanowski (2004)
- Zbigniew Bartuś (2005)
- Andrzej Kozioł (2006)
- Marian Nowy (2007)
- Grzegorz Miecugow (2008)
- ks. Adam Boniecki (2009)
- Wacław Krupiński (2010)
- Maria Lisińska Kozioł (2011)
- Jerzy Jurecki (2012)
- Sławomir Mokrzycki (2013)
- Tadeusz Kwaśniak (2014)
- Jan Zych (2015)
- Jan Stępień (2016)

=== Green Pear ===
- Katarzyna Kobylarczyk (2004)
- Wojciech Brzeziński (2005)
- Katarzyna Janiszewska (2006)
- Marta Paluch (2007)
- Tomasz Ponikło (2008)
- Dariusz Zalewski (2010)
- Magdalena Hejda (2009)
- Marcin Ogdowski (2011)
- Piotr Rąpalski (2012)
- Piotr Tymczak (2013)
- Agnieszka Łoś (2014)
- Mateusz Kudła (2015)
- Agnieszka Molęda-Pietras (2016)

=== Honorary Pear ===
- Ludwik Jerzy Kern (2001)
- Olgierd Jędrzejczyk (2010)
- Jerzy Pomianowski (2011)
- Jerzy Skrobot (2012)
- Zbigniew Bajka (2013)
- Zbigniew Święch (2014)
- Jan Pieszczachowicz (2015)
- Mieczysław Czuma (2016)
- Andrzej Sikorowski (2017)
