= Grzegorz Miecugow =

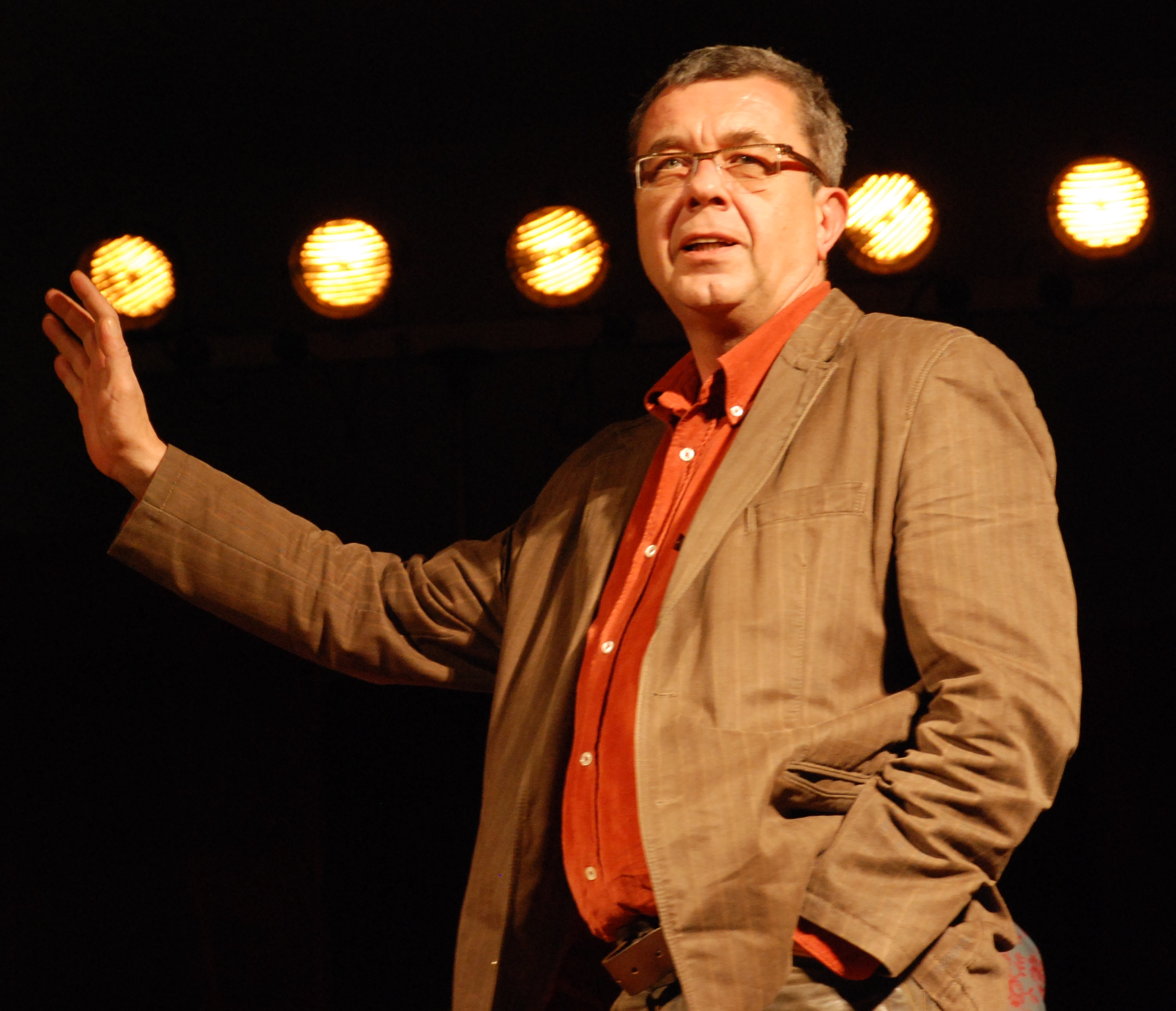
- Grzegorz Miecugow
- Born: 22 November 1955; Kraków, Polish People's Republic
- Died: 26 August 2017 (aged 61); Warsaw, Poland
- Occupation(s): journalist, newscaster, columnist
- Awards: Ostre Pióro Award (2005); Wiktory Award (2006); Golden Pear (2008)

Grzegorz Miecugow (22 November 1955 – 26 August 2017) was a Polish media personality of Armenian-Georgian descent. He had an extensive career as a journalist, newscaster, editor, and columnist.

== Career ==
He was born on 22 November 1955 in Kraków, in the Polish People's Republic. He graduated from John III Sobieski High School No 2 in Kraków and later graduated in philosophy from the University of Warsaw. Between 1989 and 2001 he worked in Polish Radio Programme III. Miecugow was a news anchor on Wiadomości and Fakty TVN. In 2001 he hosted the first edition of the Polish version of Big Brother reality show. He was one of the principal founders of TVN24 – the first 24-hour television news channel in Poland launched on 9 August 2001. He regularly published his articles in Dziennik Polski newspaper and collaborated with Przekrój weekly magazine. Miecugow also worked as an academic teacher in Collegium Civitas where he taught journalism.

In 1997, he starred in Adek Drabiński's comedy film Pułapka and in 2007 he played a role in Stanisław Tym's film Ryś.

In January 2005, he became the host of Szkło kontaktowe – a daily satirist programme broadcast on TVN24 which quickly became immensely popular among the viewers across all of Poland. He also created his own TV programme called Inny punkt widzenia (Another Point of View) in which he discussed important topics relating to science, religion, culture, society and philosophy with invited guests.

He had a wife Joanna and a son Krzysztof.

== Death ==
Miecugow died of lung cancer in Warsaw on 26 August 2017. He was buried at the Powązki Military Cemetery in Warsaw.
