= Depositary (film) =

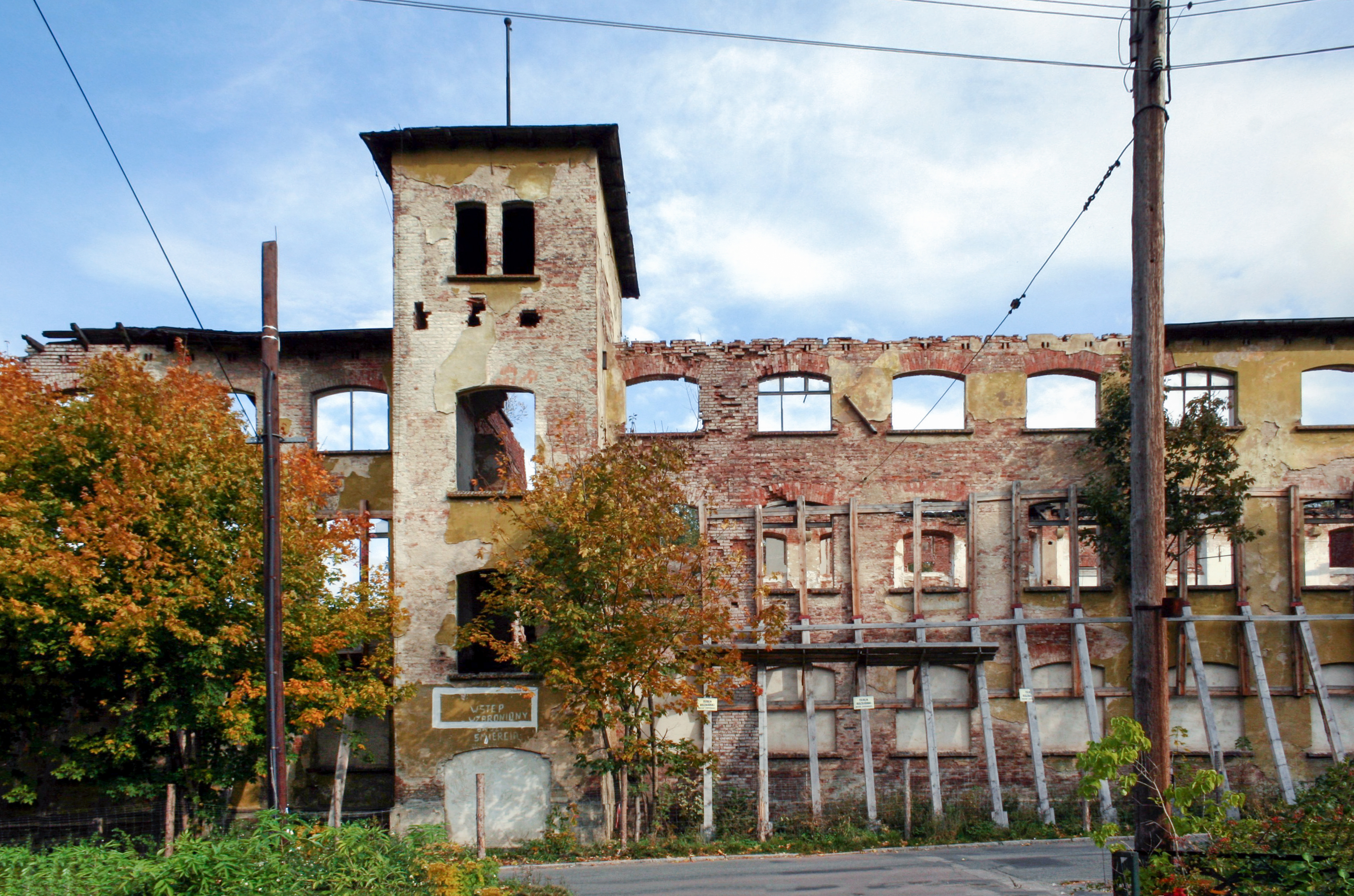
- Ruins in Walim, Poland
- Also known as: Depozytariusz
- Directed by: Mateusz Kudła
- Country of origin: Poland
- Original language: Polish

Production
- Cinematography: Artur Głupczyk
- Running time: 12 minutes

Original release
- Network: TVN24
- Release: 2014

Depositary (Polish: Depozytariusz) is a 2014 Polish short documentary film.

The film was broadcast by the Polish 24-hour news channel TVN24 and shown at the 27th Polish Film Festival, Chicago and Media Festival “Man in Danger” in Lodz.

== Synopsis ==
Łukasz Kazek finds caches of documents, photos, personal mementos, etc., hidden in Owl Mountains of Lower Silesia, formerly belonging to Nazi Germany by the local German inhabitants who left their houses hurriedly during their post World War II expulsion.

The Pole finds owners of lockers so that sentimental treasures could be returned to them after seventy years.

== Festivals ==
- Polish Film Festival in America (2015)
- Media Festival “Man in Danger” in Lodz (2015)
- The Best Shorts Competition (2016) - Award of Merit Special Mention
- Southampton International Film Festival (2016)
- International Historical And Military Film Festival in Warsaw (2016)
