= Andreas Krause Landt =

German journalist and publisher

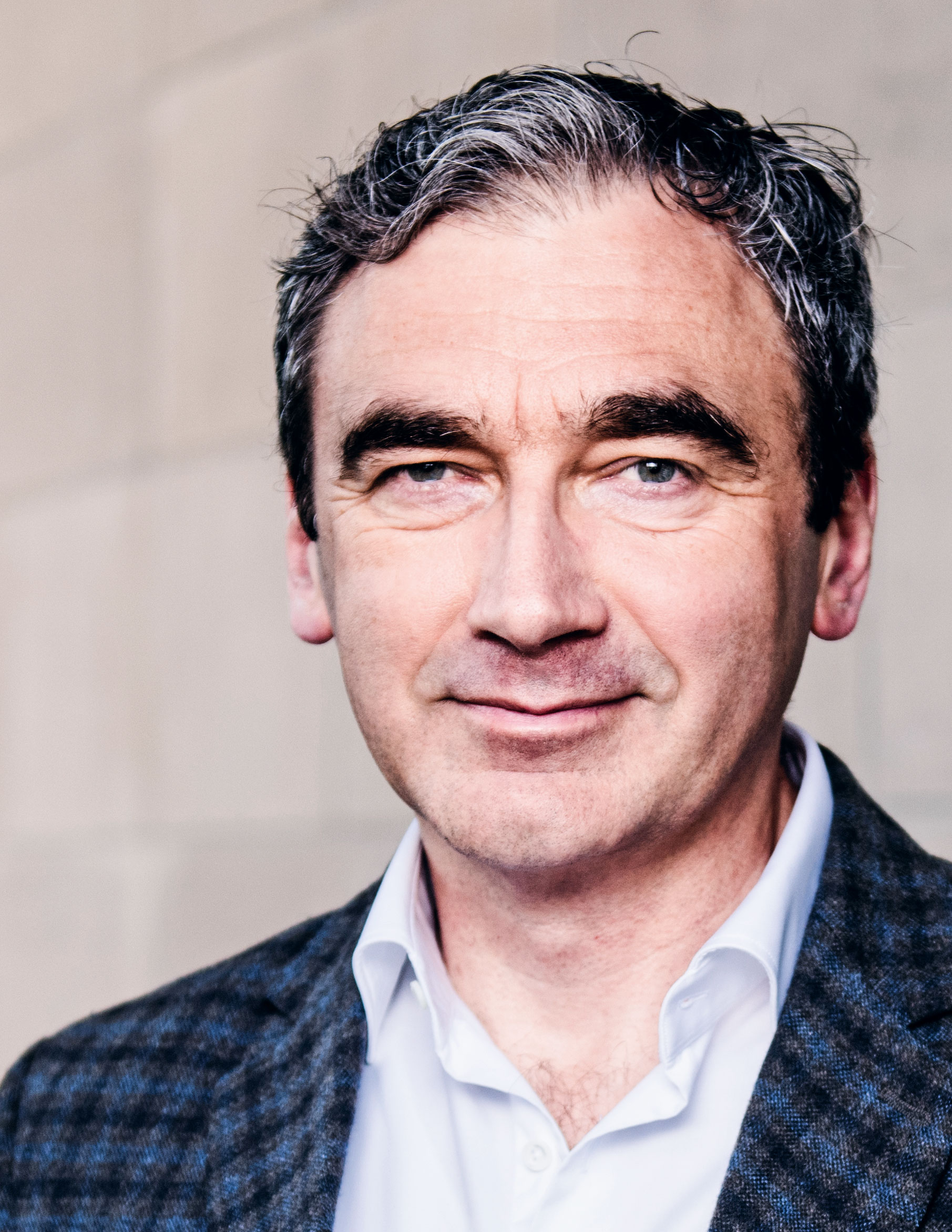
- Lombard in June 2017
- Born: 1963 (age 62–63)
- Other names: Andreas Lombard
- Occupations: Journalist and publisher

Andreas Krause Landt (born 1963), also known as Andreas Lombard, is a German journalist and publisher of Jewish ancestry, and the author of popular history books.

== Biography ==
Krause Landt was born in Hamburg in 1963, the paternal grandson of the French Calvinist pastor Jules Sully Lombard. He studied philosophy, German literature, and history at Heidelberg University and the Free University of Berlin, completing his studies in 1993 with a Magister's thesis entitled "Topographies of the sublime: alienation and aestheticism in the work of Peter Weiss".

He then worked writing screenplays for dubs and from 1996 as a freelance journalist, notably for the Berliner Zeitung and Deutschlandradio Kultur.

In 2005 he founded the publisher Landt Verlag, which publishes mainly works on 19th- and 20th-century history. In 2007 Krause Landt received the Gerhard Löwenthal Prize for journalism in recognition of his work at Landt Verlag.

On 30 July 2013, Krause Landt expressed a stance against adoption of children by same-sex couples.

Andreas Lombard is the editor-in-chief of the conservative magazine CATO.

== Published works ==
- Scapa Flow. Die Selbstversenkung der wilhelminischen Flotte. Ullstein, Berlin 1999, ISBN 978-3-550-06979-6.
- Holocaust und deutsche Frage. Ein Volk will verschwinden. In: Merkur. Nr. 680, December 2005.
- Mechanik der Mächte. Über die politischen Schriften von Panajotis Kondylis. In: Falk Horst (Hrsg.): Kondylis – Aufklärer ohne Mission. Berlin 2007.
- Mein jüdisches Viertel, meine deutsche Angst. Edition Antaios, Schnellroda 2010, ISBN 978-3-935063-93-7.
- Wir sollen sterben wollen. Warum die Mitwirkung am Suizid verboten werden muss. Edition Sonderwege, Waltrop/Leipzig 2013, ISBN 978-3-937801-78-0.
- Herr Sibelius ist Mutter geworden, in: Neue Ordnung, Heft 3 (Juni)/2013, S. 195–206
- Haus und Land. Das Herzogtum und Großherzogtum Oldenburg von 1773 bis 1918. In: Jörg Michael Henneberg, Horst-Günter Lucke (Hrsg.): Geschichte des Oldenburger Landes. Herzogtum, Großherzogtum, Freistaat. Münster 2014, ISBN 978-3-402-12942-5, S. 25–169.
- Sich selbst zum Feind werden. Die neue Konjunktur der Sterbehilfe gesellschaftskritisch gedeutet. In: Rainer Beckmann, Claudia Kaminski, Mechthild Löhr (Hrsg.): Es gibt kein gutes Töten. Acht Plädoyers gegen Sterbehilfe. Edition Sonderwege, Manuscriptum Verlagsbuchhandlung, Waltrop/Leipzig 2015, ISBN 978-3-944872-17-9, S. 41–62.
- Homosexualität gibt es nicht. Abschied von einem leeren Versprechen. Edition Sonderwege, Manuscriptum Verlagsbuchhandlung, Waltrop/Leipzig 2015, ISBN 978-3-944872-24-7.
- Das Kind als Produkt. Über das antifamiliäre Projekt der Moderne, in: Neue Ordnung, Heft 6 (December)/2018, S. 98–111
- The Vanity of Guilt, in: First Things (New York), November 2019

As editor

- with Akif Pirinçci: Attacke auf den Mainstream – „Deutschland von Sinnen“ und die Medien. Edition Sonderwege, Manuscriptum Verlagsbuchhandlung, Waltrop/Leipzig 2014, ISBN 978-3-944872-09-4.
