= Gerhard Löwenthal Prize =

German award

The Gerhard Löwenthal Prize (German: Gerhard-Löwenthal-Preis) is an award for "liberal-conservative journalism" (freiheitlich-konservativen Journalismus) in Germany. Endowed by German "Foundation for Conservative Education and Research" (Förderstiftung Konservative Bildung und Forschung), it is awarded in cooperation with national-conservative newspaper Junge Freiheit and Ingeborg Löwenthal, widow of conservative journalist and Holocaust survivor Gerhard Löwenthal. Issued annually between 2004 and 2009, it has since been awarded only biannually. The prize money is 5,000 euros.

== Recipients of the Gerhard Löwenthal Prize ==
Recipients of the prize have been:

- 2004 – Thorsten Hinz, writes for Preußische Allgemeine Zeitung and Sezession
- 2005 – Stefan Scheil, historian
- 2006 – Thomas Paulwitz, founder of the magazine Deutsche Sprachwelt
- 2007 – Andreas Krause Landt, founder of the Landt Verlag
- 2008 – Ellen Kositza, author
- 2009 – André F. Lichtschlag, founder of the magazine eigentümlich frei
- 2011 – Michael Paulwitz, writes for Sezession
- 2013 – Birgit Kelle, journalist
- 2015 – Martin Voigt, freelancer
- 2017 – Sabatina James, journalist
- 2019 – Alexander Wendt, journalist

== Recipients of the Gerhard Löwenthal honorary prize ==
A special honorary prize has been awarded to:

- 2004 – Herbert Fleissner
- 2005 – Caspar von Schrenck-Notzing
- 2006 – Elisabeth Noelle-Neumann
- 2007 – Wolf Jobst Siedler
- 2008 – Peter Scholl-Latour
- 2009 – Helmut Matthies
- 2011 – Ernst Nolte
- 2013 – Karl Feldmeyer
- 2015 – Heimo Schwilk
- 2017 – Bruno Bandulet
- 2019 – Vera Lengsfeld
