= Jorge Mantilla Ortega Prize =

The Jorge Mantilla Ortega Prize (established in 1990) is the most prestigious journalism award in Ecuador. It is awarded by El Comercio to the winners of the Concurso de Periodismo Jorge Mantilla Ortega (English: The Jorge Mantilla Ortega Journalism Competition).

Past recipients include Alfonso Reece Dousdebés, Esteban Michelena, Francisco Febres Cordero.

The award is in honor of Jorge Mantilla Ortega (1907-1979), former co-owner and editor-in-chief of the Ecuadorian newspaper El Comercio.
