= Decisionism =

Political, ethical and jurisprudential doctrine

Decisionism (derived from the German Dezisionismus, which is sometimes encountered untranslated in English texts) is a political, ethical and jurisprudential doctrine which states that moral or legal precepts are the product of decisions made by political or legal bodies. According to decisionism, it is not the content of the decision, but rather the fact that it is a decision made by the proper authority, or by using a correct method, which determines its validity.

== Jurisprudence ==
In legal theory, decisionism had a notable proponent in the German law scholar Carl Schmitt. Schmitt held that it is not the actual precepts of the law which determine its validity, but rather the fact that it has been made into law by the proper authority. Later in life, when Schmitt became a member of the NSDAP, he used decisionism as a way of justifying Nazi policy, when he was quoted as saying "Der Führer has made the law, der Führer protects the law".

== See also ==
- Political voluntarism
