= Vera Lengsfeld =

German politician (born 1952)

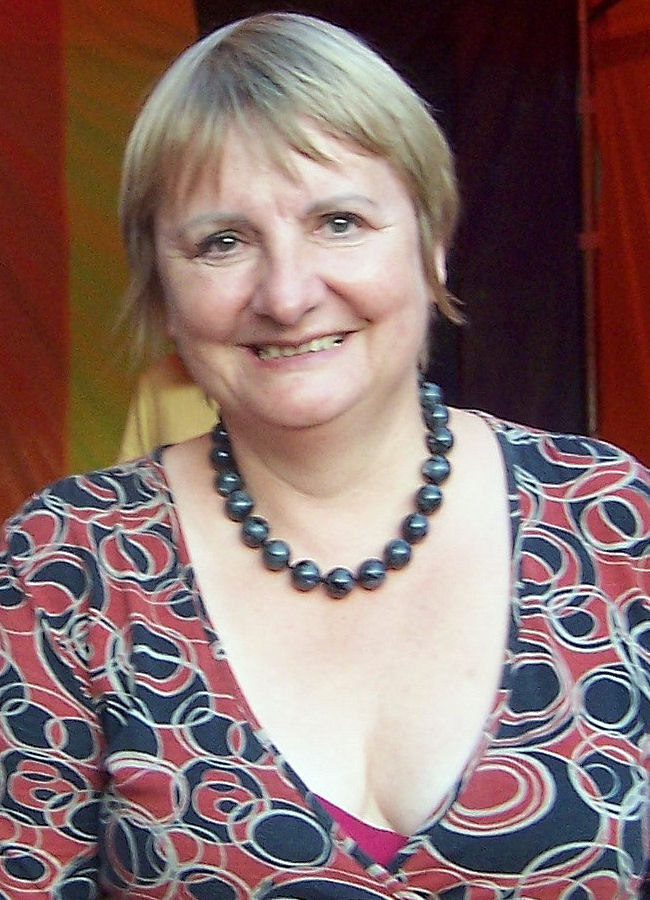
- Lengsfeld in 2009

Member of the Bundestag for Thuringia (Volkskammer; 1990)
- In office 4 October 1990 – 18 October 2005
- Preceded by: Joachim Gauck
- Succeeded by: multi-member district

Member of the Volkskammer for Berlin
- In office 5 April 1990 – 2 October 1990
- Preceded by: Constituency established
- Succeeded by: Constituency abolished

Personal details
- Born: 4 May 1952 (age 74) Sondershausen, East Germany
- Party: Christian Democratic Union (1996–2023)
- Other political affiliations: Alliance 90/The Greens (1993–1996); East German Green Party (1990–1993); Socialist Unity Party (1975–1983)
- Children: 3
- Education: Leipzig University; Humboldt University of Berlin
- Occupation: Politician

Vera Lengsfeld (born 4 May 1952) is a German politician. She was a prominent civil rights activist in East Germany and after the German reunification she first represented the Alliance 90/The Greens and then the German Christian Democratic Union (CDU) in the Bundestag.

== Early life ==
Lengsfeld was born in Sondershausen. Her father was an officer in the Stasi, the East German secret police. After leaving school she studied Philosophy at Humboldt University Berlin. Following her studies, she worked as a lecturer and researcher at the National Institute of Philosophy in the Academy of Sciences of East Germany. From 1975, she was a member of the Socialist Unity Party of Germany (SED). After a party procedure she was transferred to the Institute for Scientific Information. In 1981 she left the academy and went to work as an editor.

She became a born-again Christian in 1981, and was active in various civic organizations in East Germany (GDR). She was the co-founder of Pankow Peace Circle in the autumn of 1981, the Environment Library Berlin; Profession group and the Church from Below in 1986. Their commitment included the organization of numerous events of the peace and environmental movements in the GDR, including a "Peace laboratory", "Peace Conference", "Environment Seminar", "Human Rights Seminar," "Church from Below". She was a member of the Continuation Committee for the delegates meeting of the peace group members, who gathered under the title "Specifically for Peace" a year. She was co-organizer of the first human rights seminar held in 1986 in Berlin.

Due to her public protests against the stationing of Soviet nuclear missiles in East Germany, she was expelled from the SED in 1983 and her profession. In the following years she earned her living as a beekeeper and translator. In 1985 she graduated with a Theology degree.

In January 1988 she was arrested in advance of the demonstration in honour of Liebknecht and Luxemburg in East Berlin carrying a poster declaring "Every citizen has the right to express his opinion freely and openly" (Article 27 of the Constitution of East Germany) and detained in Berlin Hohenschönhausen prison. She was put on trial by the city district of Lichtenberg on the grounds of "attempted riotous assembly" and although given a custodial sentence she was instead allowed the option of leaving the GDR on a temporary visa effectively deporting her from the country. In February 1988 she went to Cambridge in the United Kingdom where she studied Philosophy of Religion at St. John's College. On the morning of 9 November 1989 she returned to East Germany.

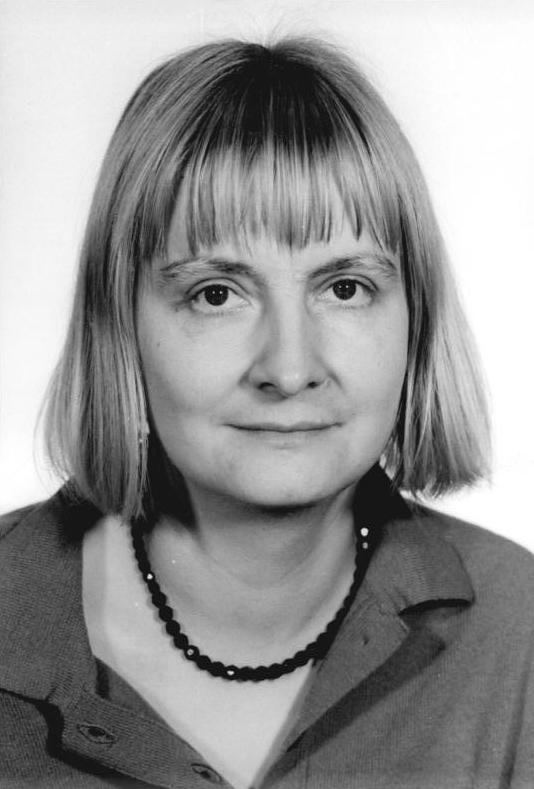
Vera Wollenberger (1990)

== After German reunification ==
After the Fall of the Berlin Wall she resumed her work as a civil rights activist and served as a member of the Constitutional Commission on the reunification of West Germany and East Germany. At this time she joined Alliance 90, the Green Party of the GDR, and at the 1990 election was elected to the member of the GDR parliament until its dissolution on 2 October 1990 as a member of Alliance 90/The Greens, the coalition between Alliance 90 and The Greens. Then at the first election after German reunification she was elected to the Bundestag.

In 1991 she protested the Gulf War by keeping quiet during her allotted speech time in the Bundestag until she was cut off.

She was re-elected in the 1994 General election. However, in 1996 Alliance 90/The Greens decided to enter into alliances with the Party of Democratic Socialism, the successors to the former SED. A civil rights activist rather than a leftist, Lengsfeld together with other civil rights activists such as Guenter Nooke and Ehrhart Neubert defected to the Christian Democratic Union (CDU). She was re-elected at the 1998 and 2002 elections as a CDU list candidate in her home state of Thuringia. However, for the 2005 election she stood in a single member constituency instead and lost her seat. For the 2009 election she ran in the Berlin-Friedrichshain-Kreuzberg – Prenzlauer Berg East constituency, the only constituency in the Bundestag to be represented by her former party Alliance 90/Greens. With CDU having finished a distant fourth at the previous election she was thought to have no chance of success and in the event she finished a distant fourth, slightly increasing the CDU vote share.

In August 2009 she produced election posters featuring photos emphasizing her cleavage along with a picture of Angela Merkel in a very low-cut dress, emblazoned with the slogan We have more to offer. The posters drew a great deal of attention and some criticism. They were featured on Japanese television and in Brazilian and Peruvian newspapers. Some of the posters were reportedly stolen as souvenirs according to the Agence France-Presse news agency.

Lengsfeld has opposed immigration into Germany, and helped to organize the Erklärung 2018 declaration and petition in opposition to it.

On 30 November 2023, she resigned from the CDU.

== Personal life and Stasi observation ==
In 1980 she married her second husband, the mathematician and poet Knud Wollenberger with whom she has two sons. Wollenberger was born in Denmark and enjoyed travel privileges. Unbeknownst to Lengsfeld, he had been a Stasi informant since 1972, and during their marriage he continued to file reports on her activities. It is not known whether the Stasi specifically ordered him to approach Lengsfeld. They divorced in 1992 after his Stasi involvement had come to light. Lengsfeld later said that she felt betrayed that anyone could marry or have children under such circumstances. He later explained to her that he, as a Jew, supported the GDR since he saw it as a response to Auschwitz. She forgave him in 2000 when he was gravely ill.

Lengsfeld's father retired from the Stasi in 1986 rather than obey an order to break with his daughter; in 1988 he publicly took her side.

Her son Philipp was treasurer of the CDU parliamentary group of the district assembly of Berlin's Pankow district.

== Published works ==
- Virus der Heuchler. Innenansicht aus Stasiakten, Espresso/Elef.Press, Berlin 1992, ISBN 3-88520-435-5
- Mein Weg zur Freiheit. Von nun an ging's bergauf. Langen Müller, Berlin 2002, ISBN 3-7844-2857-6.
- Neustart! Was sich in Politik und Gesellschaft ändern muss. Umdenken lohnt. Freiheit und Fairness statt Gleichheit und Gerechtigkeit. Berlin 2006, ISBN 3-7766-2490-6.
- Ich wollte frei sein. Die Mauer, die Stasi, die Revolution. Herbig Verlag, München 2011, ISBN 978-3-7766-2669-8.

== See also ==
- List of German Christian Democratic Union politicians
