= Panagiotis Kondylis =

Greek philosopher and intellectual historian (1943–1998)

- Panagiotis Kondylis's only published picture
- Born: 17 August 1943; Drouva near Olympia, Elis, Greece
- Died: 11 July 1998 (aged 54); Athens, Greece

Education
- Education: University of Athens; Goethe University Frankfurt; University of Heidelberg
- Doctoral advisor: Dieter Henrich

Philosophical work
- Era: 20th-century philosophy
- Region: Western philosophy
- School: Continental philosophy Western Marxism; Conservatism; Decisionism
- Main interests: Social philosophy, political philosophy, philosophy of culture
- Notable ideas: Ideologies as instruments of legitimation, objectification of the decision, morphology of thought (empirical Here/supra-empirical Beyond, Being/Semblance), friend-enemy as the constitutive axis of worldpictures and ideologies, polemical consistency outflanks logical consistency, battle for the monopoly of interpretation, the fusion of the drive for self-preservation with the belief in the meaning of life.

Panagiotis Kondylis (Greek: Παναγιώτης Κονδύλης; German: Panajotis Kondylis; 17 August 1943 – 11 July 1998) was a Greek philosopher, intellectual historian, translator and publications manager who principally wrote in German, in addition to translating most of his work into Greek. He can be placed in a tradition of thought best exemplified by Thucydides, Niccolò Machiavelli and Max Weber.

== Life ==
Born in 1943 in the small community of Drouva (Δρούβα) in the municipality of Olympia, Greece, where the Kondylis' family house is still standing today, he moved with his father, who was a military officer, at the age of six to Kifisia, Athens, where he attended school. Kondylis studied classical philology and philosophy at the University of Athens (at which time he was drawn to Marxism), as well as philosophy, medieval and modern history and political science at the Universities of Frankfurt and Heidelberg. During his postgraduate studies at Heidelberg he earned his PhD (under the supervision of Dieter Henrich) with a study of the origins of post-Kantian German idealism, including the early years of Hegel, Schelling and Hölderlin entitled Die Entstehung der Dialektik (The Genesis of Dialectics), which supported views considered innovative and provocative at the time, including illuminating the pre-history of Marxism and the world-theoretical presuppositions of the Marxist philosophy of history. Outstanding German historians Werner Conze and Reinhart Koselleck were important guiding influences during his formative years at Heidelberg.

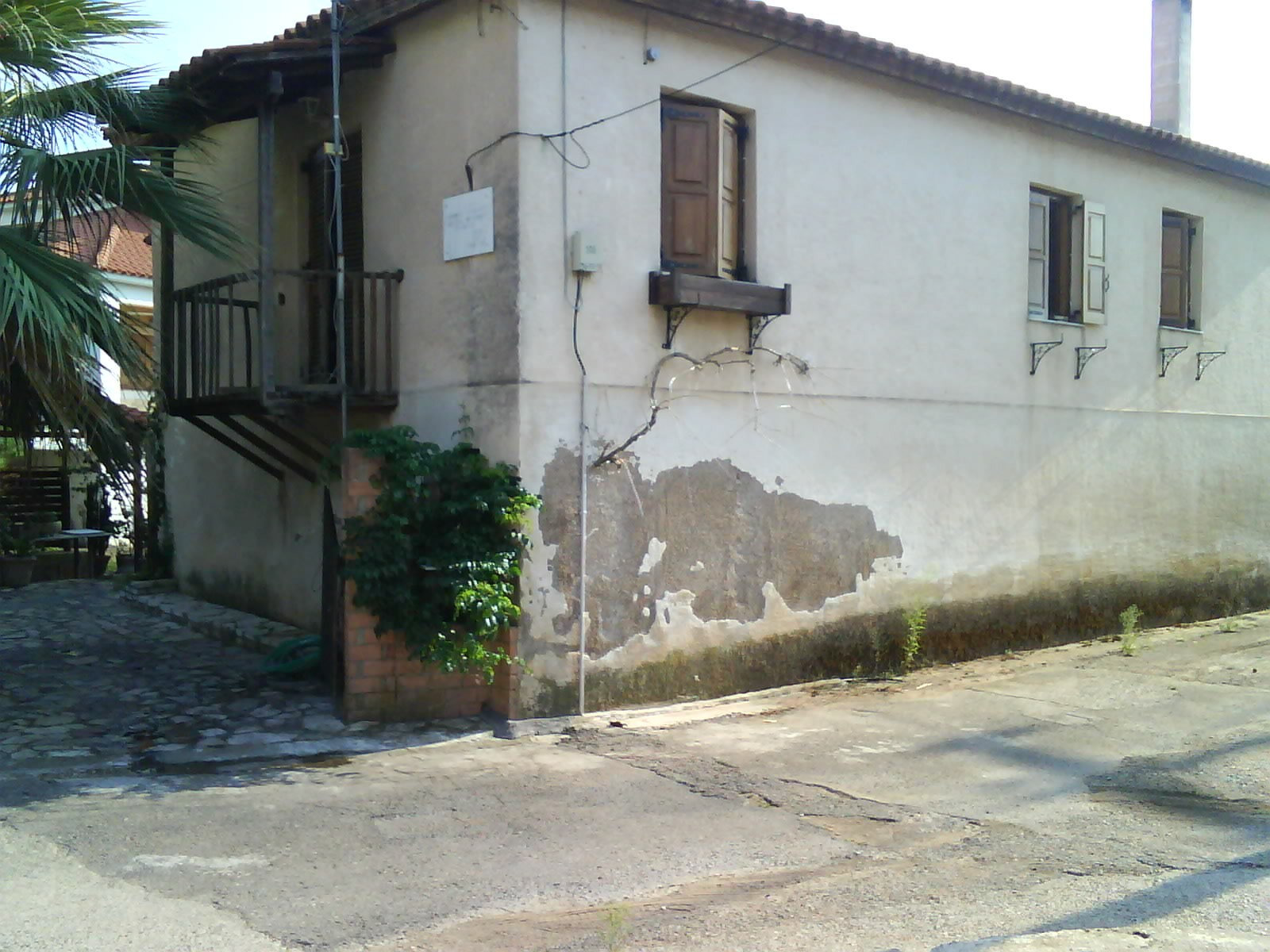
The house of Panagiotis Kondylis's parents in Drouvas, Ancient Olympia. Kondylis moved to Kifisia, Athens, at the age of six

Kondylis was awarded the Goethe Medal in 1991. As a recipient of the Humboldt Prize he also was in 1994/95 a fellow of the Wissenschaftskolleg in Berlin. Kondylis, though, was independent – a Privatgelehrter (private scholar) who never aspired to an academic career apart from one attempt in the early 1980s when he entered into discussions with the Philosophy Department of the University of Athens, applying for a placement. His application was confronted with the distrust of the conservative faculty of the philosophical department. Although Kondylis was supported by the then well-known professor Theofilos Veikos, he still had to contend with the opposition of multiple university-based philosophers and subsequently did not succeed in commencing a career as an academic. Thereafter, he never expressed any wish for an academic career (expressing the view that "academic philosophy is dead and buried"), although he was offered a number of honorary placements, including by the University of Ioannina, which he politely refused.

He died in Athens in 1998. His library of some 5000 titles based in his house in Politeia, Athens was donated by his sister, Melpo Kondylis (Μέλπω Κονδύλη), to the Aristotle University of Thessaloniki in which a special "Kondylis" section exists in the campus library. In November 2008 a conference was held in Heidelberg honouring the memory of the late Panagiotis Kondylis. A similar event was held in Greece on 22 May 2008.

== Work ==
The great bulk of his corpus was written in German, and most of his writings were translated by Kondylis himself into Greek. He was interested in a number of areas of study including: the Enlightenment and the preceding Renaissance-era critiques of metaphysics; the philosophy of war and Clausewitz, as well as the work of Hegel and Marx; Western bourgeois culture and its decline; Conservatism; post-Modernity, and International Affairs. He also translated into modern Greek classic works by authors such as: Xenophon, Burnham, Machiavelli, Marx, Lichtenberg, Pavese, Montesquieu, Chamfort, Rivarol, Schiller, Cassirer and Carl Schmitt. Moreover, he was publications manager of the Greek-language "Philosophical and Political Library" (editions Γνώση (1983–1998; 60 volumes)) and "Modern European Civilisation" (editions Νεφέλη (1997–2000; 12 volumes)), producing modern Greek translations of renowned texts by authors as diverse as: Hobbes, Lyotard, Foucault, ancient Greek Sophists and Cynics, Moscovici, Sorel, Heidegger, Burckhardt, Michels, Aron, Leo Strauss, Derrida, Locke, Hauser et al., and histories of modern Greek philosophy. Kondylis's best known books are: Die Aufklärung (The Enlightenment) and Macht und Entscheidung (Power and Decision).

=== Underlying themes ===
Kondylis claimed to be "scientific" in the sense of writing "descriptively" (and explanatorily), in separating Is (facts) from Ought (values), rather than writing "prescriptively" or "normatively". The thread running through all of Kondylis's writings (whether primarily focussed on the history of ideas, social ontology, historical sociology, geopolitics, etc.) is his position that the historical plethora and variety of individual, social and theoretical behaviour or endeavour unfolds against a backdrop of the anthropological law (or constants) of "power" and "decision". Such "power" and "decision" continually traverse a friend–foe spectrum within historically formed (and currently dynamic) societies characterised by varying degrees of multi-faceted social relations of individual and collective subjects (in and through which e.g. biological impulses are rationally justified and embellished so that their voice is heard as the command of ethics; the impulse of self-preservation manifests itself as "meaning of life"; and sexual urges are dressed up as "love"). Orientation, identity formation, hierarchisation, interpretation, the production of normative systems, ideologies, rationality as self-control and the abandonment or postponement of immediate gratification, etc., are all means through which power relations manifest themselves socially and distinguish human civilisations from the basic instinctual behaviour and unrationalised raw violence of the animal kingdom (in short: humans accept "meaning" in seeking power, whereas animals do not). As human societies become more complex (and materially wealthier), power and its self-intensification ceases to often coincide with mere physical superiority (as in the case of primitive conditions), and power is often objectivised through greater use of historically determined and relative ((re-)interpreted and often contested) symbols and values. However, raw physical power is always at least potentially available for use by individual and collective subjects who wish to maintain and expand their power. Even scientific knowledge is not beyond historical determination and polemical manipulation – but only scientific knowledge, if it consistently separates Is from Ought, can explain in terms of corroboration with empirical reality the abundant variety of human existence and "knowing".

=== The Political and Man ===
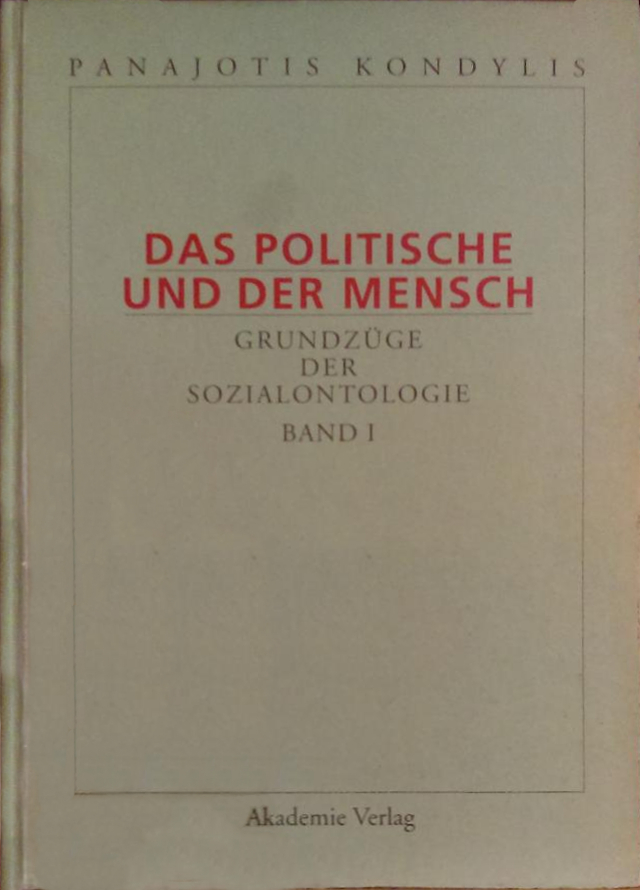
Book cover of Das politische und der Mensch.

His final major work Das Politische und der Mensch (The Political and Man) remained unfinished at the time of his death, but nevertheless managed to present a unified social-scientific theory or "value-free" description of social phenomena, encompassing socio-ontological, sociological and historical aspects of the study of human affairs. Kondylis's conception of social ontology does not offer any fixed causalities or laws nor does it say what people ought to do or not do in any given situation or how their social action should unfold. The task of social ontology is accordingly not to reduce fluid and varied phenomena to basic samples and basic genetic factors; what is sought is to show the spectrum of the forces and factors, which can be constituted and become discernible only from the – irreducible and inexhaustible – diversity of form. Such forces and factors, of course, include certain constants such as striving for self-preservation through the expanding of one's own power, and the friend–foe relation, which exist in all societies and are actualised in concrete historical situations and therefore have concrete dimension and content e.g. when the dominant paradigm might be theocentrism or anthropocentrism or mass democratic post-Modernity. Much of the nearly completed first volume (three volumes had been planned by Kondylis) is an analysis of mass-democratic ideology in the social sciences while also dealing with methodological and theoretical questions such as the distinction between "socio-ontic observation" and "socio-historical observation" and the three key aspects of the social: the social relation, the political and man. Moreover, Kondylis examines the social relation as regards its "internal" mechanism of subjectivity and "external" mechanism of action, the friend–foe polarity and the social relation's continuity, in addition to exploring the concepts of understanding and rationality by way of an extensive examination and/or critique of numerous renowned authors such as Martin Buber, Émile Durkheim, Wilhelm Dilthey, Jürgen Habermas, Martin Heidegger, Edmund Husserl, Niklas Luhmann, George Herbert Mead, Alfred Schütz, Talcott Parsons, Karl Popper, Georg Simmel, Ferdinand Tönnies, Max Weber and Leopold von Wiese.

=== The Enlightenment and intellectual history ===
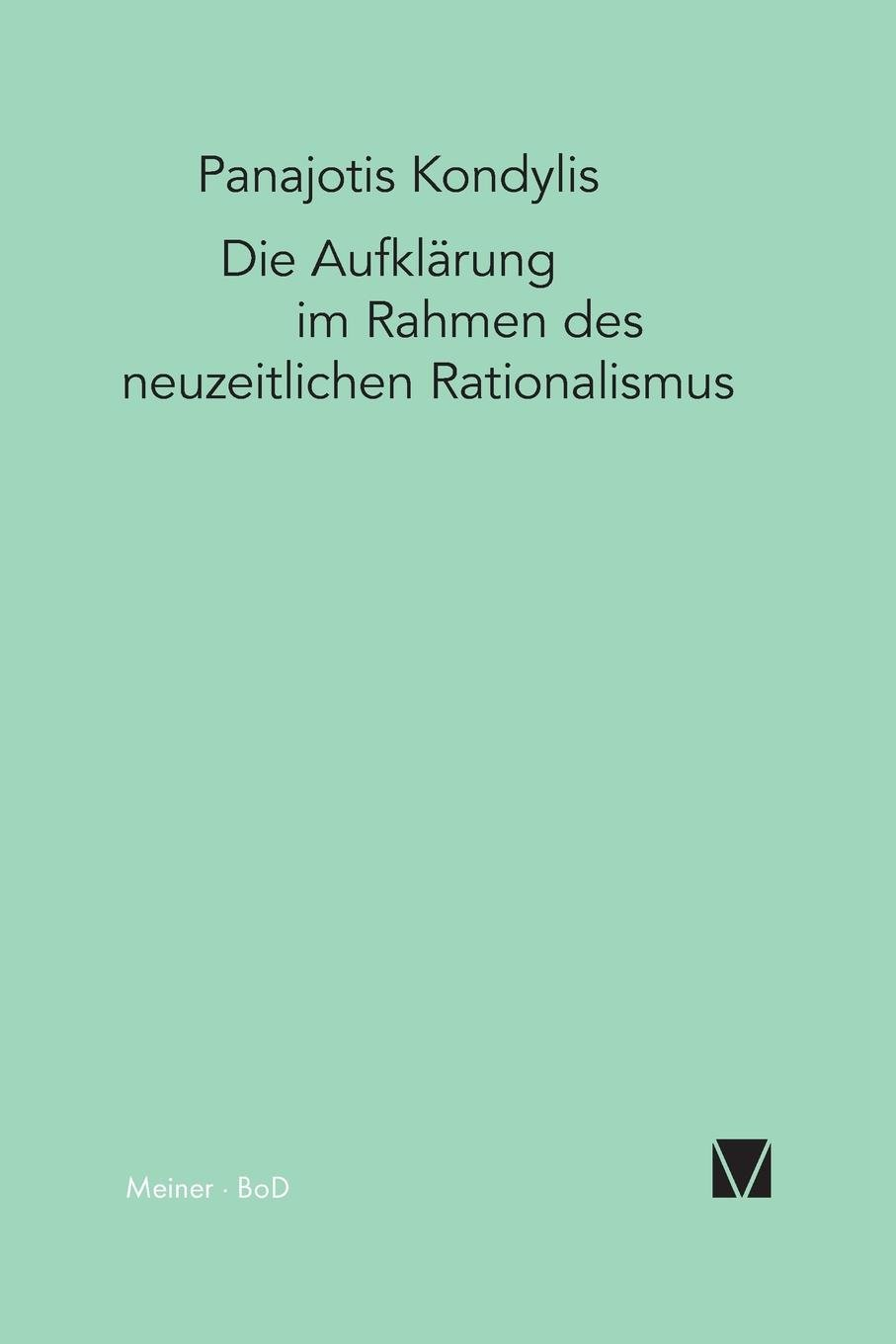
Book cover of Die Aufklärung im Rahmen des neuzeitlichen Rationalismus (The Enlightenment within the Framework of Modern Rationalism).

Apart from being a comprehensive survey of the major polemical trends in the European History of Ideas from the end of the Middle Ages and the subsequent turn against Cartesian Rationalism by a number of mainstream and other Enlightenment figures promoting a "new" or revived sensualism, until the post-Kantian period of Schelling and Hegel, Die Aufklärung (The Enlightenment), together with Die neuzeitliche Metaphysikkritik (Modern-era Criticism of Metaphysics), can be seen as analyses of the European Modern Era's struggle against value-relativity and nihilism, which were the logical conclusion of the overall rationalist positioning in the European Modern Era. Against the Aristotelian metaphysics of essence, the notion of function was recruited, and then the danger of breaking-down all essences into variable functions had to be confronted with the invention of new beings: "Nature", "Man" and "History" thus succeeded God and the (transcendental) Spirit. However, the notion of function totally prevailed in the course of the 20th century in the context of overthrowing essence on a global scale (notwithstanding the ongoing and socially inevitable influence of various ideologies and religions); see The Decline of Bourgeois Thought- and Life-Forms below. Throughout these books, self-preservation and power appear as key concepts in interpreting human affairs, and in setting aside all dualisms and Platonisms, all the traditional distinctions between Hither and Thither, the ideal and reality, understanding and volition. From the point of view of the history of ideas, while the philosophers who did systematically set aside such dualisms were few and far between (e.g. Machiavelli, Hobbes, Spinoza, La Mettrie, de Sade, and to a lesser extent, Diderot, Helvetius, Holbach, Hume), quantitatively, philosophers expounding versions of the traditional distinctions mentioned above, or at least maintained a normative stance necessary to seek social influence, prevailed for much of the European Modern Era, and Kondylis also analysed the basic stance(s) of such and other thinkers including: Alembert, Condillac, Condorcet, Grotius, Hegel, Hamann, Herder, Kant, Leibniz, Lessing, Maupertuis, Newton, Rousseau, Shaftesbury, Voltaire, and Wolff, in considerable detail, as well as referring to other (pre-)Enlightenment thinkers (in addition to those mentioned above) such as: Augustine, Aquinas, Aristotle, Bacon, Bayle, Berkeley, Bruno, Descartes, Erasmus, Galilei, Locke, Pascal, Plato, Pufendorf, Telesio, etc. In both The Enlightenment and Modern-era Criticism of Metaphysics, Kondylis runs a compelling interpretative thread through the constant reformulation of concepts and positioning and apparently overwhelming volume of argumentation, from the late Middle Ages until the 19th century (and 20th century in the case of Modern-era Criticism of Metaphysics, which includes analyses of: Bergson, Dilthey, Feuerbach, Heidegger, Malebranche, Mill, Nietzsche, Occam, Russell, Salutati, Spencer, Whitehead, Wittgenstein, and Zabarella), producing scholarly works that not only have a handbook or reference text quality but also an ability to provide insight into the motive forces of development of, and changes in, the history of ideas in the European Modern Era (see also Conservatism below) before the onset of the new Planetary Era.

=== Power and De-cisio ===
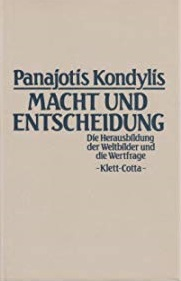
The cover for the German edition of Power and De-cisio

In Macht und Entscheidung (Power and De-cisio) Kondylis set forth the theoretical basis for his attitude to existence and his own endeavours as an author and social scientist. "Decision" is here conceptualised differently from its hitherto known varieties in decisionism; now it appears as a theory about the emergence of individual and collective worldviews. Such an emergence as a function of power i.e. self-preservation through self-enhancement (or self-intensification), always refers to enemy positioning, and as such always contains normative elements within itself. Kondylis examines the claimed bindingness and also ambiguity inherent in all ideologies and social institutions. Drawing from anthropology, philosophy, sociology and history, concepts such as value, value-freedom and nihilism are explored. It is claimed that the infinite variety of human perceptions, beliefs, ideologies, i.e. world-views, are nothing more than an effort to give personal interests a normative form and an objective character, deriving from a "decision" on what means should be used, who should be a friend and who a foe, in the big "Hobbesian" struggle for what is the most primitive and common goal of all humans – self-preservation. Therefore, personal and/or group world-views and ideologies in general are used as a weapon in everyday struggle for the purpose of power claims and self-preservation. Social and historical being and becoming consist of transitory existences – regardless of whether they invoke Reason and ethics or not – seeking power (in any one or more of its forms). That is how Nature's (and society's) creatures are, and they cannot do otherwise.

=== Conservatism ===
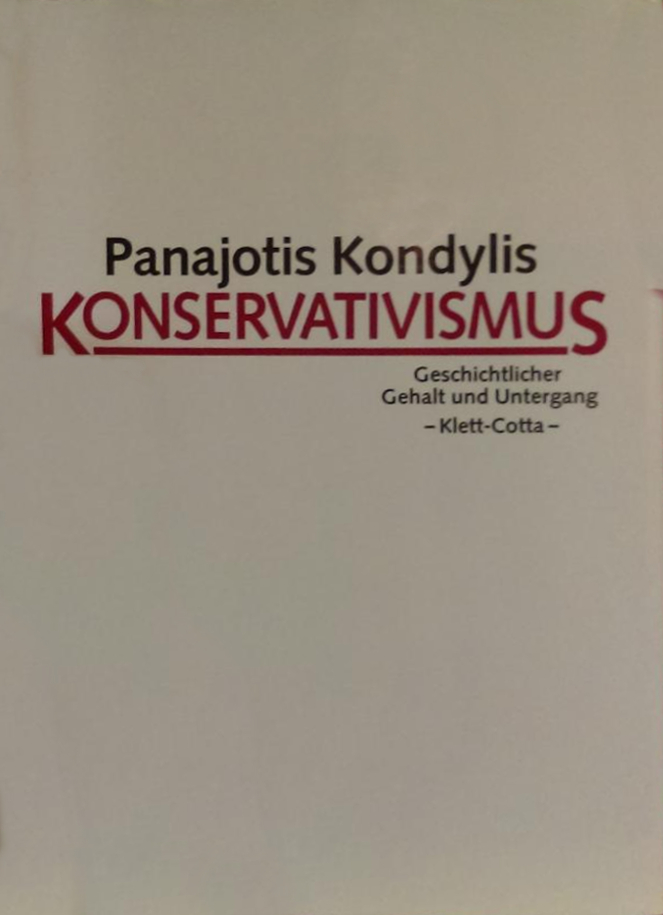
Book cover of Konservativismus. Geschichtlicher Gehalt und Untergang.

Kondylis's next book, Konservativismus. Geschichtlicher Gehalt und Untergang. (Conservatism. Historical Content and Decline.), like The Enlightenment, which broke new ground in its novel interpretation of such a pivotal period in European philosophy, went against the grain of conventional wisdom on the history of conservatism understood simply as a reaction to the French Revolution as articulated by e.g. Karl Mannheim. Rather, in Kondylis's book, conservatism had already existed as a social and political force since the Middle Ages in which the nobility and its estate system, having derived its legitimacy from a particular conception of law as a privilege, combated emerging egalitarian interpretations of law in the European Modern Era, which encompassed the rise of the modern sovereign state, albeit initially in absolutist guises (among which were the attempt to impose religious tolerance and peace in the aftermath of the Reformation and the religious wars). Nevertheless, the book also examines conservatism as a political force adapting to the reality of the modern sovereign state's eventual triumph and in light of the French Revolution and beyond. Included is an analysis of how the central themes used in the socialist criticism of capitalism were initially formed in the ideological realm of the counter-Revolution, whose social conveyor of this first anti-capitalist criticism was the patriarchal great-landholder, the older or younger aristocrat, who saw his social existence being eroded and falling apart by the irrepressible march of mercantile-monetary relations, the Industrial Revolution and by individualistic-liberal ideas. What followed was an idealised image of pre-capitalist reality, whereby people lived united by the bonds of blood, tradition and mutual faith and protection, from the earth and in nature, preserving their existential essence from the fragmentation which is imposed by the advanced division of labour and the continuous hunt for material gain in a society cut up into competitive individuals. Key intellectuals during conservatism's history include: Bonald, Burke, Carlyle, Chateaubriand, Cortés, Fénelon, Haller, Jarcke, Maistre, Moser, Müller, Radowitz, Schlegel, and Stahl.

While Kondylis identifies himself with Marxism, some view him as a conservative thinker. American paleoconservative intellectual Paul Gottfried names Panagiotis Kondylis "one of the great conservative thinkers of our age".

=== Theory of War ===
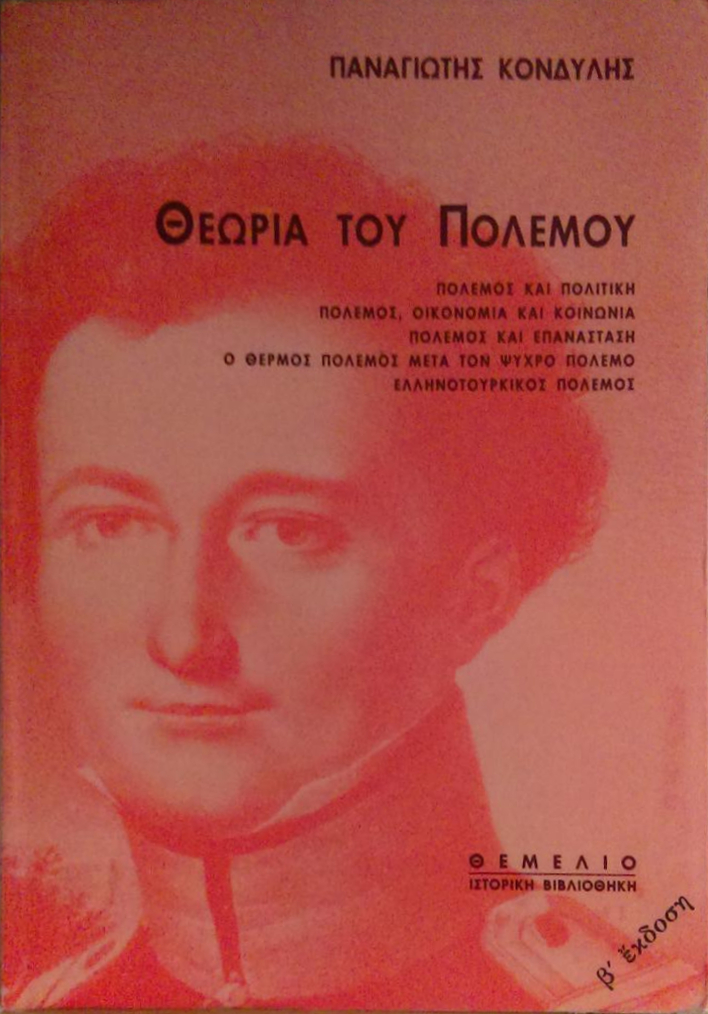
Book cover of the Greek edition of A Theory of War.

In Theorie des Krieges (Theory of War), Kondylis opposed Raymond Aron's liberal interpretation of Clausewitz's theory. According to Aron in Penser la guerre Clausewitz was one of the first writers condemning the militarism of military elites and their war-proneness (based on the famous sentence "war is a continuation of politics by other means"). Kondylis claimed that this was a reconstruction not coherent with Clausewitz's thought. Clausewitz was, according to Kondylis, morally indifferent to war from a theoretical point of view, and his propounding of the value of political rule over war had nothing to do with pacifistic claims. For Clausewitz war was just a means in the eternal quest for power in an often anarchical and unsafe world, and as such war could neither be a continuous phenomenon, nor cease altogether. In other words, war arose from the political (i.e. "political communication") in the wider sense of social existence encompassing society as a whole (inclusive of anthropological factors), and whether war occurred at a particular time or not depended on a correlation of social and political forces encompassing collective and individual input into any given state of affairs. Kondylis saw in Clausewitz a general theory of war with sufficiently inclusive and elastic conceptualisation which could cover all forms of strategy – even antithetical forms: from primitive guerrilla warfare to extremely technicised contemporary war, as well as the possibility of terrorism using advanced technology to cripple modern-day societies. Kondylis continued with an analysis of Lenin's, Engels's and Marx's theories of war, articles about military staff and politicians, technological and absolute war, and concluded (in the Greek edition) with an analysis of a possible Greek–Turkish war.

=== The Decline of Bourgeois Thought ===
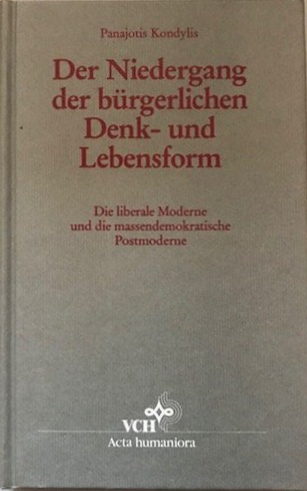
Book cover of the German edition of The Decline of Bourgeois Thought- and Life-Forms.

In Der Niedergang der bürgerlichen Denk- und Lebensformen. Die liberale Moderne und die massendemokratische Postmoderne (The Decline of Bourgeois Thought- and Life-Forms. The Liberal Modern and the mass-democratic Post-modern), Kondylis used Weberian ideal-typical analysis to outline the great "paradigm shift" of post-Modernity from around 1900 onwards, in bringing to an end the previously dominant bourgeois-liberal hierarchical and humanist world-view, and ushering in a new era of mass-democratic pluralism and leveling of hierarchies based on mass-democratic social formations characterised by, inter alia, historically unprecedented mass production and mass consumption, atomisation and mobility, and, not least of all, the various forms of mass-democratic ideology. To this end, Kondylis made effective use of his distinction between the "synthetic-harmonising thought-form" and the "analytic-combinatory thought-form" in which the latter set aside the former during the same period as the setting-aside of classical bourgeois liberalism by mass democracy, which for the most part occurred as the re-interpretation and changing of liberalism in accordance with the needs of mass democracy, and not always as an open and programmatic clash between the two. The "synthetic-harmonising thought-form" and the "analytic-combinatory thought-form" distinction is applied by Kondylis to his extensive overview of developments in the arts (including literature, music, architecture, the visual arts, cinema), as well as of developments in philosophy, the sciences and commonplace mind-sets and ways of living, mainly from the second half of the 19th century until the cultural revolution of the 1960s and 1970s.

=== Planetary Politics after the Cold War ===
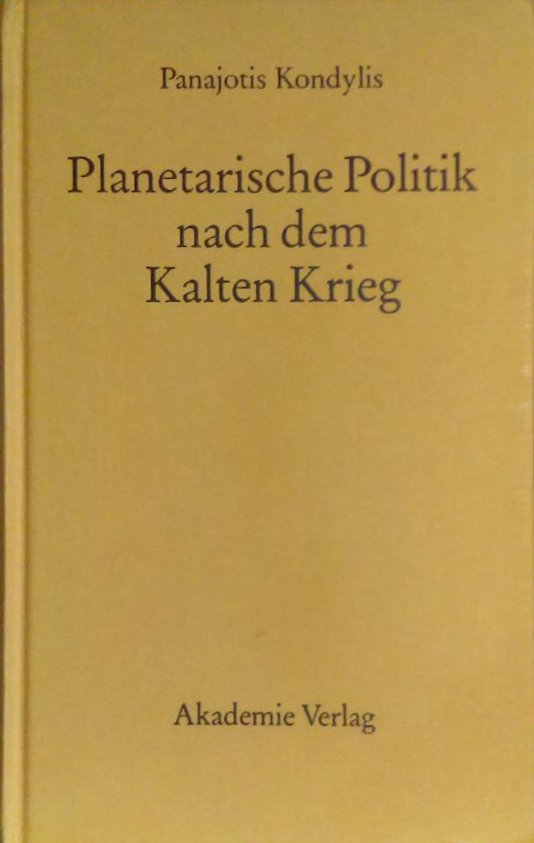
Book cover of the German edition of Planetary Politics after the Cold War.

In Planetarische Politik nach dem kalten Krieg (Planetary Politics after the Cold War), Kondylis dealt with a number of matters e.g. conceptual confusion in the overtly polemical and unhistorical use of "conservative", "liberal" and "(social) democracy"; mass democracy as the world's first international social formation; the impact of communism on the 20th century; and "human rights" as predominantly American ideology but also amenable to interpretations contrary to American interests, i.e. the dissemination of universal human rights ideology will lead to a significant increase in international conflict and increase the worldwide trend towards anomy. The end of the Cold War in particular emerges as a pivotal point in history in which the European Modern Era finds itself in its historical twilight while coming full circle, absorbed by the Planetary Era which the European Modern Era itself inaugurated with the great geographic discoveries of the 15th and 16th centuries. Planetary history gulps down its creator, European history – another one of the blaring examples of the unintended consequences of collective action in history.

Kondylis's published works as a whole can be seen as a unified series of analyses based on an unwavering adherence to empirical fact and logical consistency no matter what aspect of study is being emphasised at any given time. He sought to eliminate artificial academic boundaries between e.g. "philosophy", "anthropology", "economics", "history", "sociology" and "politics" by emphasising the interconnectedness of such disciplines from the point of view of "value-free" i.e. "power claim"-free and non-normative scientific understanding. He thought of himself as "an observer of human affairs" or "writer" or "historian of ideas, social historian and theorist" (always writing by hand), rather than as a "philosopher", producing a body of work that bears little resemblance to any other author, apart from perhaps Max Weber.

== Books and articles ==
- Die Entstehung der Dialektik. Eine Analyse der geistigen Entwicklung von Hölderlin, Schelling und Hegel bis 1802. Stuttgart: Klett-Cotta, 1979. 729 S. ISBN 3-12-911970-1 (The Coming into Being of Dialectics).
- Die Aufklärung im Rahmen des neuzeitlichen Rationalismus. Stuttgart: Klett-Cotta, 1981. 725 S. ISBN 3-12-915430-2 (The Enlightenment within the Framework of Modern Rationalism). [Greek edition: Athens, Θεμέλιο, 1987; 1993 (2nd edition)]
- Macht und Entscheidung. Die Herausbildung der Weltbilder und die Wertfrage. Stuttgart: Klett-Cotta, 1984. 129 S. ISBN 3-608-91113-8 (Power and Decision – The Formation of World Images and the Question (Problem) of Values). [Greek edition: in Ισχύς και απόφαση – Η διαμόρφωση των κοσμοεικόνων και το πρόβλημα των αξιών. Athens, Στιγμή, 1991]
- "Reaktion, Restauration", and, "Würde", in: Geschichtliche Grundbegriffe, Historisches Lexikon zur politisch-sozialen Sprache in Deutschland, hsg. v. Otto Brunner, Werner Conze, Reinhart Koselleck, Stuttgart: Klett-Cotta, 1984, 1992. [Greek editions: Athens, Ίνδικτος, 2001; 2002. Translated by Λευτέρης Αναγνώστου.]
- Konservativismus. Geschichtlicher Gehalt und Untergang. Stuttgart: Klett-Cotta, 1986. 553 S. ISBN 3-608-91428-5 (Conservatism. Historical Content and Decline).
- Marx und die griechische Antike. Heidelberg: Manutius-Verlag 1987, ISBN 3-925678-06-9. [Greek edition: in Ο Μάρξ και η αρχαία Ελλάδα. Athens, Στιγμή, 1984]
- Theorie des Krieges. Clausewitz – Marx – Engels – Lenin. Stuttgart: Klett-Cotta, 1988. 328 S. ISBN 3-608-91475-7 (Theory of War). [Greek edition: in Θεωρία του πολέμου. Athens: Θεμέλιο, 1997; 1998 (2nd edition)]
- Die neuzeitliche Metaphysikkritik. Stuttgart: Klett-Cotta, 1990. 614 S. ISBN 3-608-91330-0 (Modern-era Critique of Metaphysics). [Greek edition: Athens, Γνώση, 1983; second Greek edition (including Chapter 4): Herakleion & Athens, ΠΕΚ, 2012]
- "Nachwort", in: K. Vorländer, Geschichte der Philosophie, b. 3 (Neuzeit bis Kant), Hamburg 1990, 328–345.
- Der Niedergang der bürgerlichen Denk- und Lebensformen. Die liberale Moderne und die massendemokratische Postmoderne. Weinheim: VCH-Verlagsgesellschaft, 1991 ISBN 3-527-17773-6 (The Decline of Bourgeois Thought- and Life-Forms. The Liberal Modern and the mass-democratic Post-modern). [Greek edition: Athens, Θεμέλιο, 1991]
- "Einleitung", in: P. Kondylis (Hg.), Der Philosoph und die Lust. Frankfurt: Keip Verlag 1991, 11–34. ISBN 3-8051-0510-X. [Greek edition: in Η Ηδονή, η Ισχύς, η Ουτοπία. Athens: Στιγμή, 1992]
- "Utopie und geschichtliches Handeln", in: Politische Lageanalyse, Festschrift für Hans-Joachim Arndt zum 70. Geburtstag, hg. v. Volker Beismann und Markus Josef Klein. Bruchsal: San Casciano Verlag 1993, 163–175. [Greek edition: in Η Ηδονή, η Ισχύς, η Ουτοπία. Athens: Στιγμή, 1992]
- Planetarische Politik nach dem kalten Krieg. Berlin: Akademie-Verlag 1992 ISBN 3-05-002363-5 (Planetary Politics after the Cold War). [Greek edition: in Πλανητική πολιτική μετά τον Ψυχρό Πόλεμο. Athens: Θεμέλιο, 1992.]
- "Einleitung", in: P. Kondylis (Hg.), Der Philosoph und die Macht. Hamburg: Junius Verlag 1992, 9–36. ISBN 3-88506-201-1. [Greek edition: in Η Ηδονή, η Ισχύς, η Ουτοπία. Athens: Στιγμή, 1992]
- "Der deutsche "Sonderweg" und die deutschen Perspektiven", Westbindung, Chancen and Risiken für Deutschland, hg. v. R. Zitelmman-K. Weissmann-M. Grossheim, Berlin 1993, 21–37.
- "Marxismus, Kommunismus und die Geschichte des 20. Jh.s", H. Fleischer (Hg.), Der Marxismus in seinem Zeitalter, Leipzig 1994, 14–36.
- "Montesquieu: Naturrecht und Gesetz", Der Staat 33 (1994), 351–372.
- "Nur Intellektuelle behaupten, dass Intellektuelle die Welt besser verstehen als alle anderen." Interview von Marin Terpstra mit Panajotis Kondylis. In: Deutsche Zeitschrift für Philosophie, 42,4 (1994), 683–694.
- "Wissenschaft, Macht und Entscheidung", H. Stachowiak (Hg.), Pragmatik. Handbuch pragmatischen Denkens, b. V, Hamburg 1995, 81–101.
- "Jurisprudenz, Ausnahmezustand und Entscheidung", Der Staat 34 (1995), 325–356.
- "Universalismus, Relativismus und Toleranz in der westlichen Massendemokratie", Dialektik 1996 (3), 11–21.
- Montesquieu und der Geist der Gesetze. Berlin: Akademie-Verlag 1996 ISBN 3-05-002983-8 (Montesquieu and the Spirit of the Laws).
- "Melancholie und Polemik", L. Heidbrink (Hg.), Entzauberte Zeit, München 1997, 281–299.
- Das Politische und der Mensch Grundzüge der Sozialontologie Band 1: Soziale Beziehung, Verstehen, Rationalität. Aus dem Nachlass hg. von Falk Horst. Berlin: Akademie-Verlag 1999 ISBN 3-05-003113-1 (The Political and Man – from the unpublished (at death) manuscript of Panagiotis Kondylis). [Greek edition: Athens: Θεμέλιο, 2007. Translated by Λευτέρης Αναγνώστου.]
- Das Politische im 20. Jahrhundert. Von den Utopien zur Globalisierung. Heidelberg: Manutius-Verlag 2001 (Sammlung von 19 Artikeln aus den 1990er Jahren) ISBN 3-934877-07-9 (The Political in the 20th century – a compilation of 19 articles from the 1990s.). [Greek edition: Athens: Θεμέλιο, 1998]
- Machtfragen. Ausgewählte Beiträge zu Politik und Gesellschaft. Darmstadt: WBG 2006 (enth. Nachdruck von Macht und Entscheidung, von 6 thematisch zugehörigen Artikeln und dem Interview mit Marin Terpstra) ISBN 978-3-534-19863-4 (Questions of Power – Reprint of Power and Decision. Also includes six related articles and an interview with Marin Terpstra.)
- Machiavelli. Akademie-Verlag, Berlin 2007, ISBN 978-3-05-004046-2. [Greek edition: Athens, 1971/72]

Books and articles published only in Greek

- Η Ελλάδα, η Τουρκία και το Ανατολικό Ζήτημα. Athens: Γνώση, 1985 (Greece, Turkey and the Eastern Question).
- Ο Νεοελληνικός Διαφωτισμός. Οι φιλοσοφικές ιδέες. Athens: Θεμέλιο, 1988 (The modern Greek Enlightenment. The philosophical ideas.).
- To Αόρατο Χρονολόγιο της Σκέψης. Athens: Νεφέλη, 1998 (The Invisible Chronology of Thought. – three interviews with Panagiotis Kondylis.)
- Μελαγχολία και Πολεμική. Athens: Θεμέλιο, 2002 (Melancholy and Polemics. – a series of articles by Kondylis, published posthumously.)
- "Ταυτότητα, Ισχύς, Πολιτισμός", στο Ευ. Γκανάς (Επιμ.), Νέα Εστία, τ. 156ος, Αθήνα, Ιούλιος-Αύγουστος 2004, σσ. 6–19 ("Identity, Power, Civilisation" – 50 "notes" from the incomplete and unpublished third volume of The Political and Man).
- "Διαφορά της δημοκρίτειας και επικούρειας φυσικής φιλοσοφίας, διδακτορική διατριβή του Karl Marx, Εκδόσεις Γνώση, out of print, μετάφραση του: "Differenz der Epikureischen von der Demokritischen Naturphilosophie", Dissertation von Karl Marx, Jena 1841.

English translations

- English translations of Macht und Entscheidung (Power and Decision) and Planetarische Politik nach dem kalten Krieg (Planetary Politics after the Cold War) and of some other writings by Kondylis are available to be read free of charge: see link below "Panagiotis Kondylis website (English)".
