= Marcelo Jelen Award =

Uruguayan journalist award

Premio Marcelo Jelen
- Marcelo Jelen Award
- Native name: Premio Nacional de Prensa Escrita Marcelo Jelen
- Awarded for: Uruguayan journalist award
- Country: Uruguay
- Presented by: Cotidiano Mujer, Unesco, ONU Mujeres, Uruguayan Associated Press
- First award: 2016

Premio Marcelo Jelen (English: Marcelo Jelen Award) is a Uruguayan journalism award.

It is organized by Cotidiano Mujer, Unesco, ONU Mujeres and Uruguayan Associated Press. This initiative try to award journalist works to intend avoid unique thinking, promote diversity and no discrimination.

Some people awarded are Diana Cariboni, Victoria Fernández, Guillermo Draper and Raúl Santopietro.
