= Mateusz Kudła =

Polish film director and producer

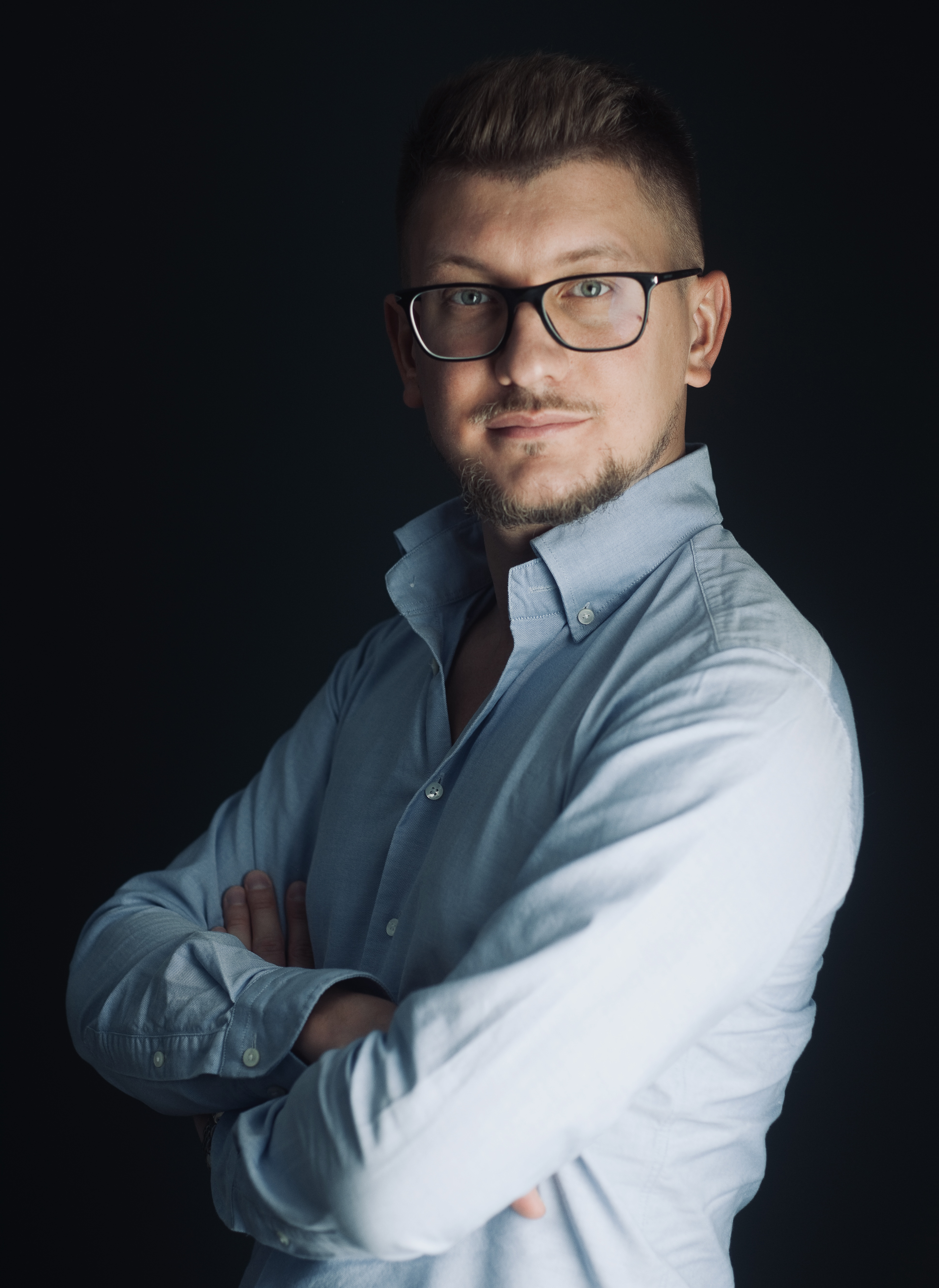
- Pronunciation: Polish pronunciation: [maˈtɛ.uʂ ˈkudwa]
- Born: September 16, 1991 (age 34); Chicago, U.S.
- Citizenship: US and Polish
- Education: Jagiellonian University
- Occupations: Film director, producer, journalist, YouTuber
- Years active: 2010 – present
- Television: TVN Warner Bros. Discovery
- Parents: Anna Kudła (mother); Tomasz Kudła (father)

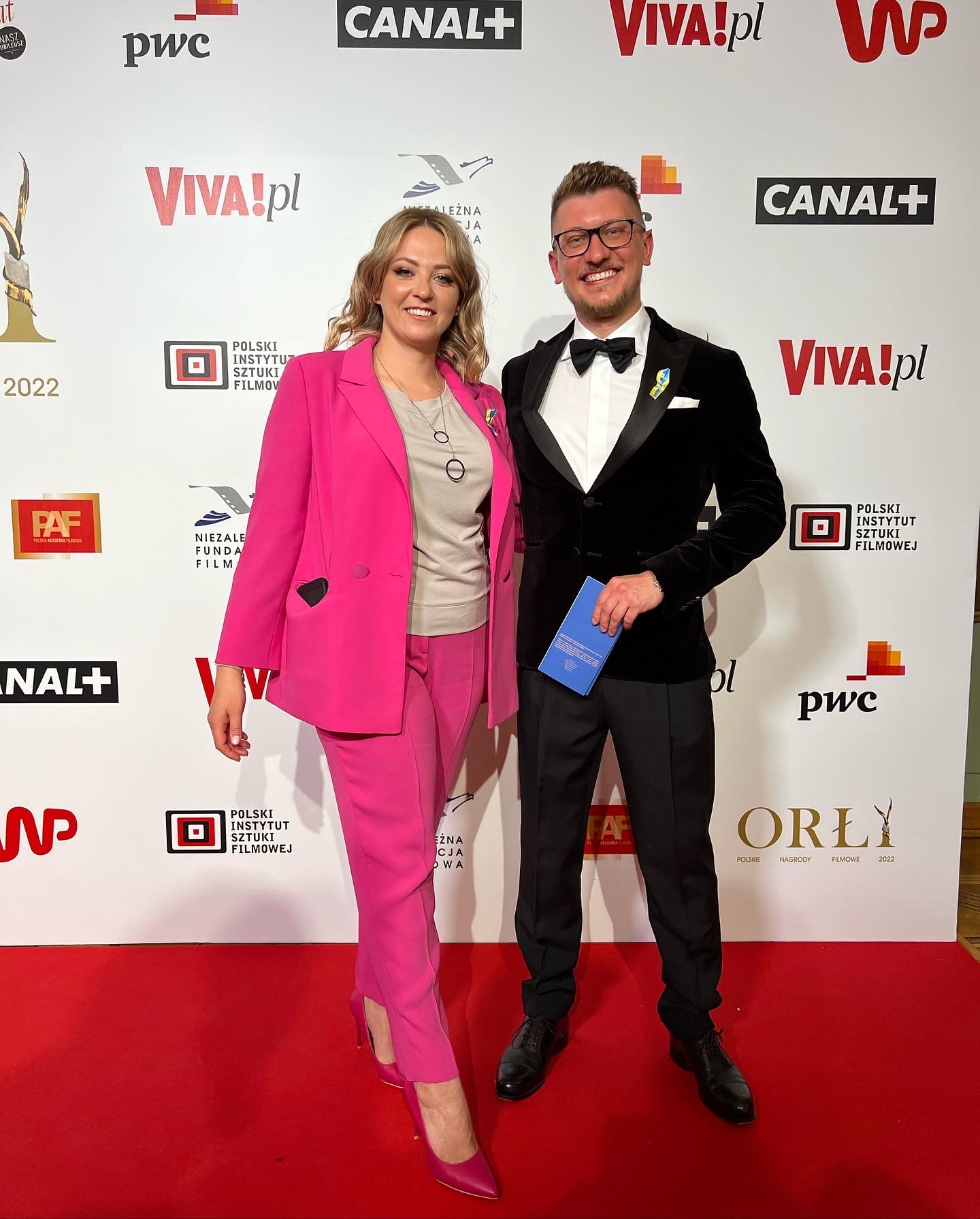
Mateusz Kudła with producer Anna Kokoszka-Romer at the Polish Film Award ceremony

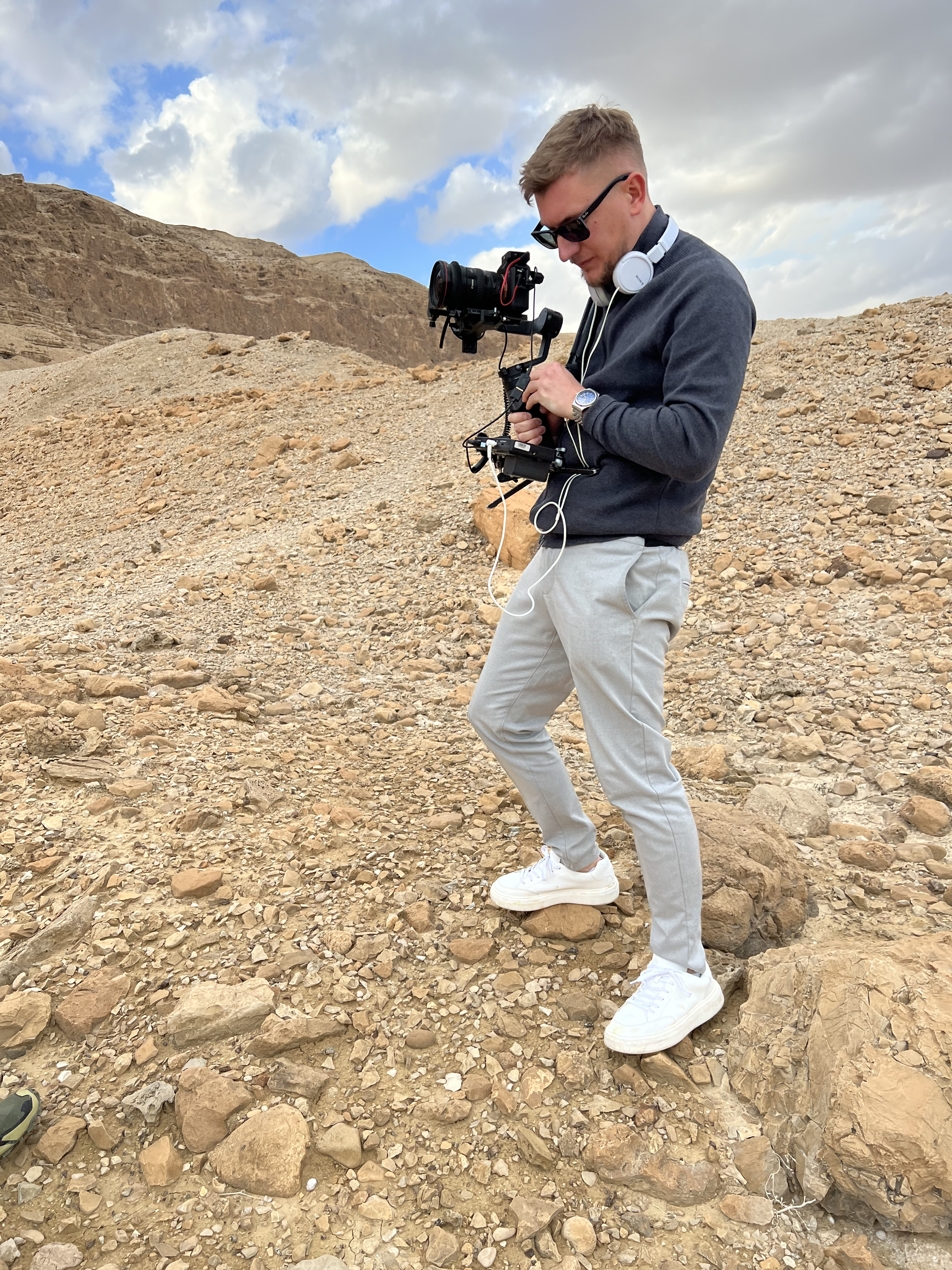
Mateusz Kudła on the set of History Hiking in the Judaean Desert, Israel

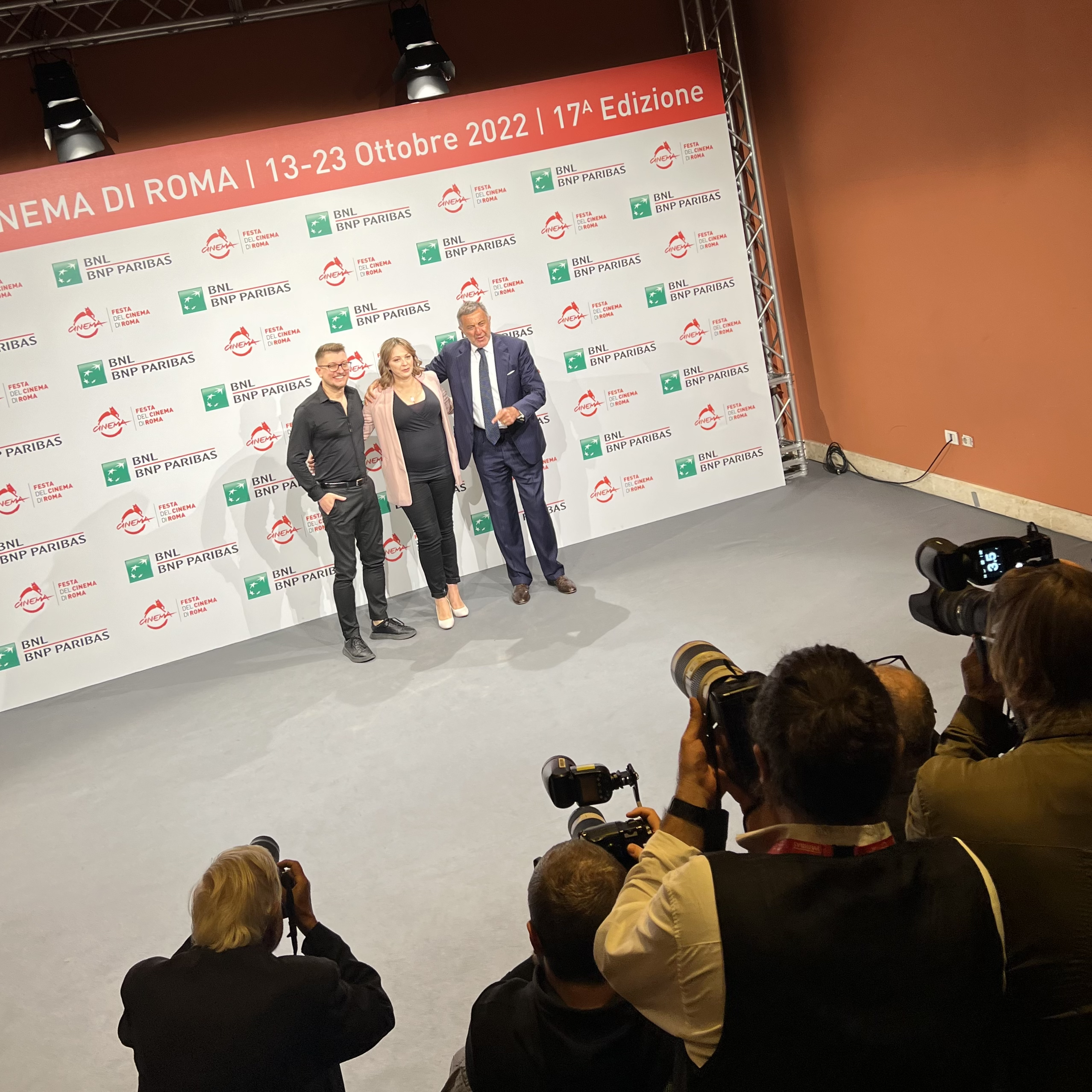
Mateusz Kudła, Anna Kokoszka-Romer and Luca Barbareschi at the Rome Film Festival

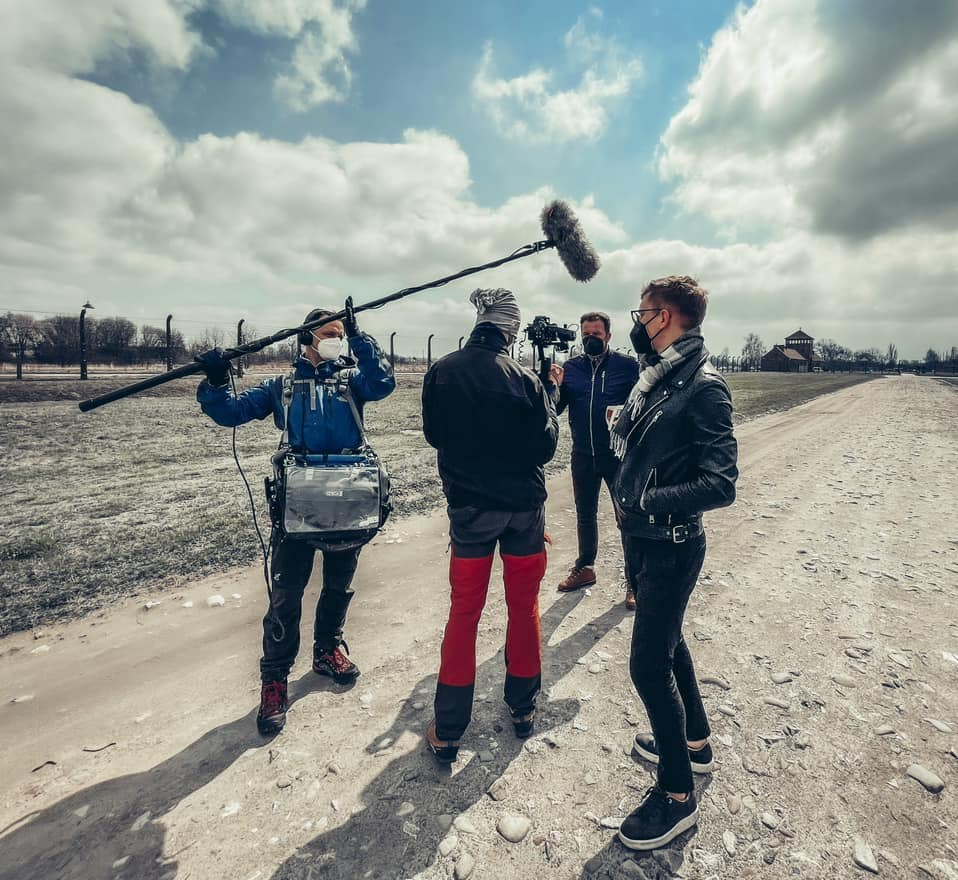
Mateusz Kudła (right) on the set of History Hiking

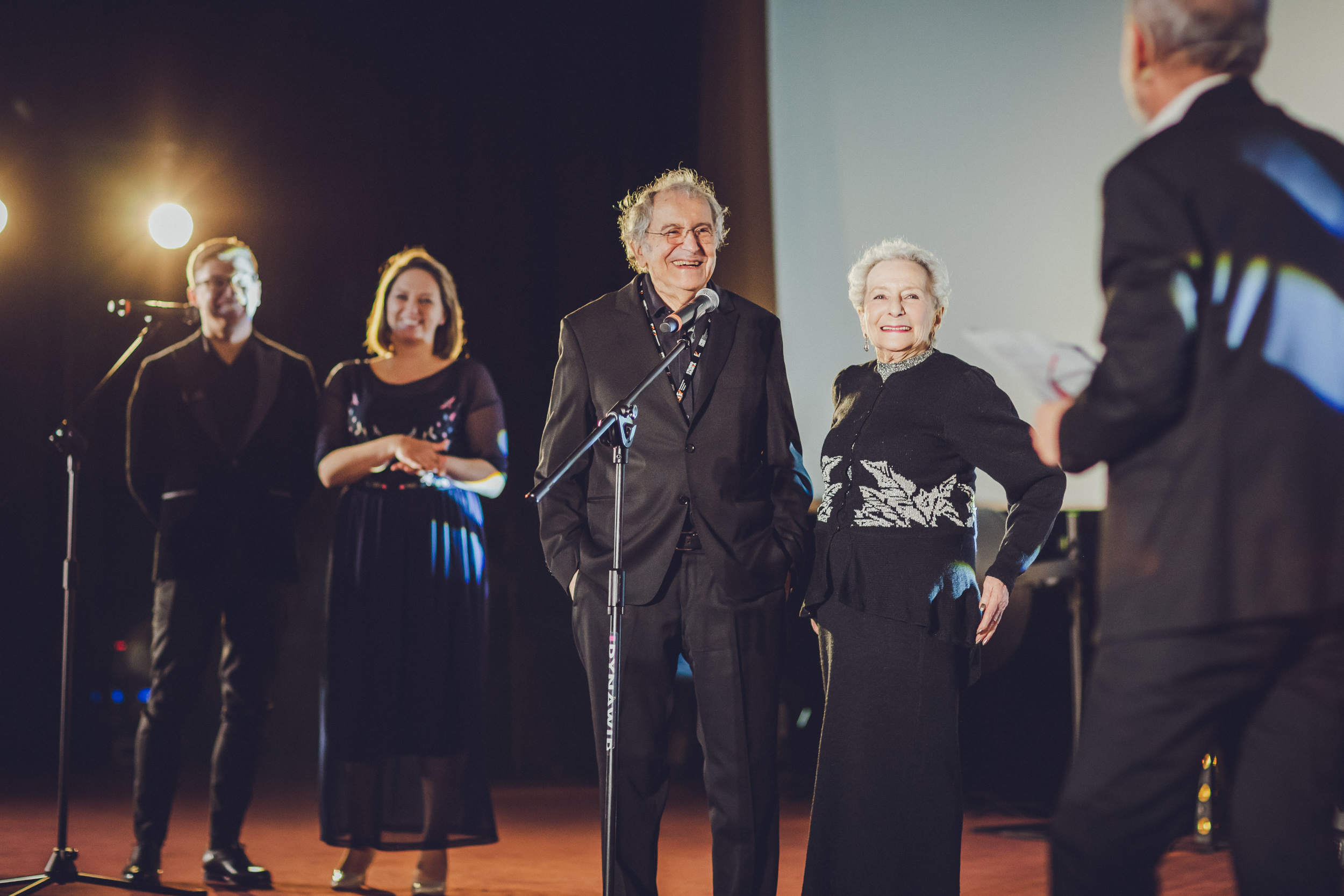
Mateusz Kudła (left) at the premiere of the Polanski, Horowitz. Hometown

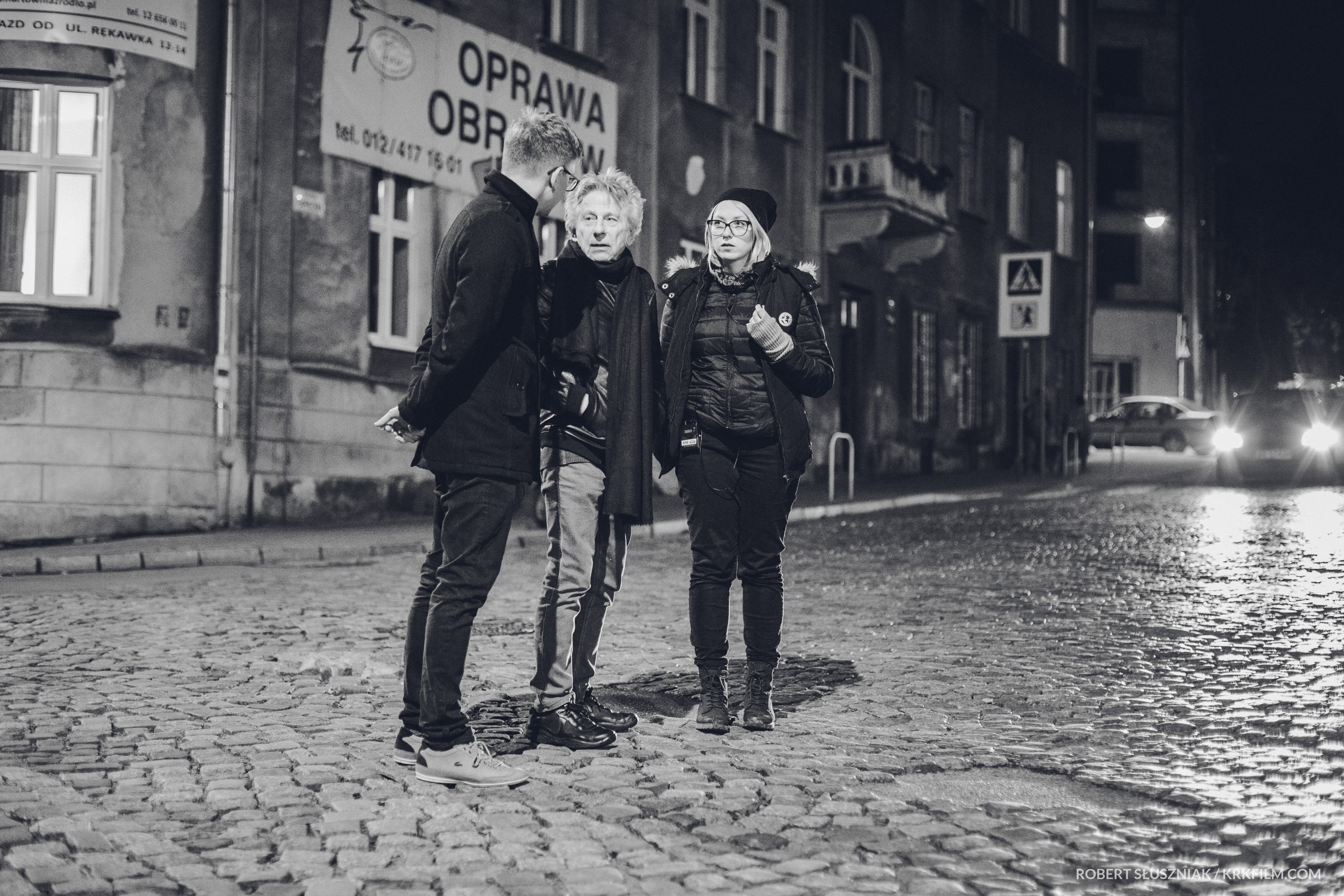
Mateusz Kudła and Roman Polanski on the set of Polanski, Horowitz. Hometown

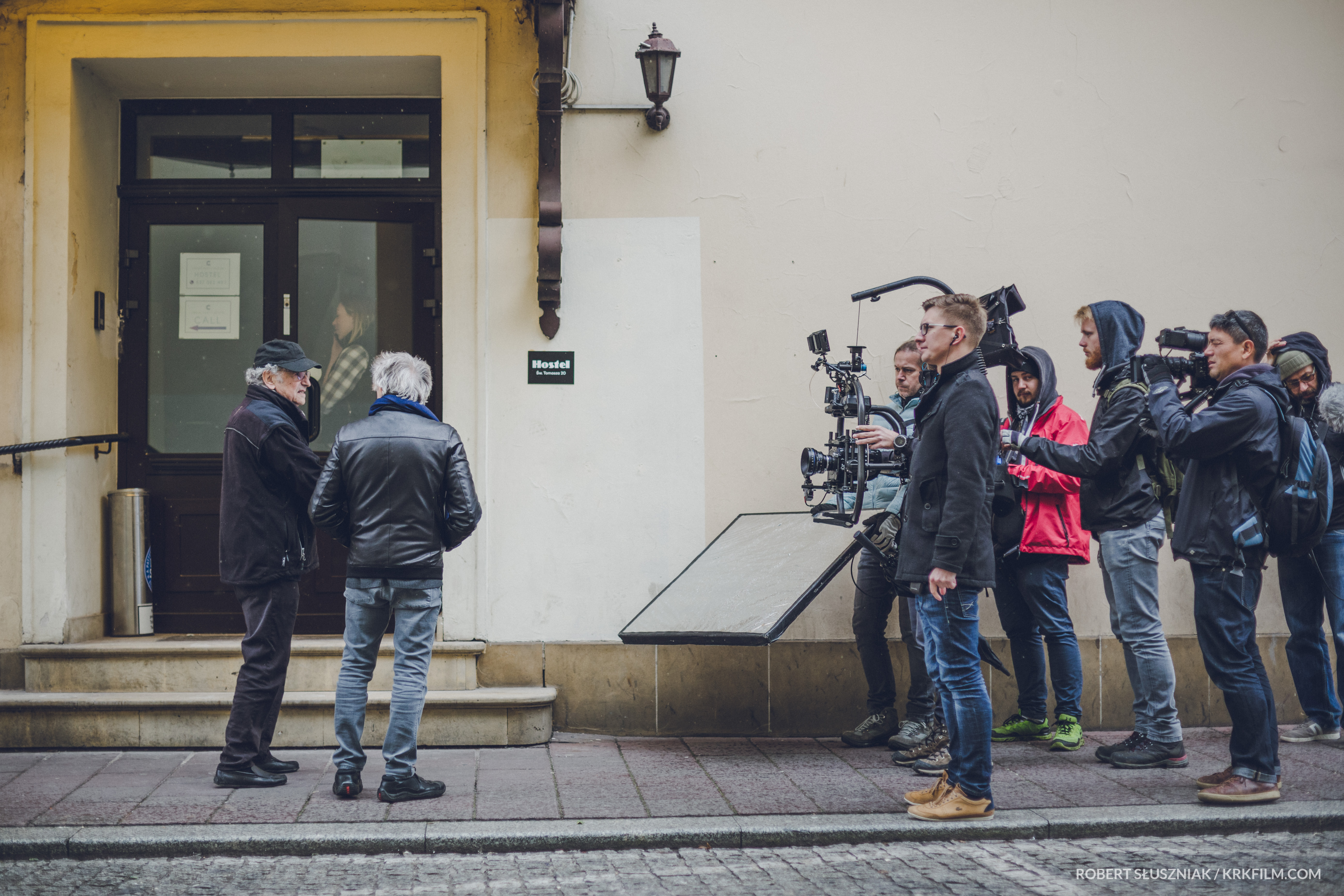
Roman Polanski and Mateusz Kudla on the set of Polanski, Horowitz. Hometown

Mateusz Kudła (Polish pronunciation: [maˈtɛ.uʂ ˈkudwa]; born September 16, 1991) is a Polish awarded film producer, director, journalist and YouTuber.

He is a member of the International Academy of Television Arts and Sciences and European Film Academy.

== Early life ==
Kudła was born on September 16, 1991, in Chicago, Illinois. His parents, Anna and Tomasz, returned to Poland a year later. He holds dual citizenship, US and Polish.

Kudła's paternal great-grandparents, Jadwiga and Stanisław Solecki, were posthumously awarded the title of Righteous Among the Nations by Yad Vashem on August 25, 2015. They risked their lives during the Holocaust to save Jewish girl, Marlena Wagner, from extermination by the Nazis. In 2017 Mateusz Kudła started producing a documentary film about Marlena Madeleine Wagner-Alster, who came to Korczyna after over 70 years with her children and grandchildren to once again see the house where her life was saved.

Kudła studied American studies at the Jagiellonian University in Kraków. Mateusz Kudła started working in the media at the age of 18. As he recalls, in order to take his final exams, he had to take a leave from Onet.pl, the largest Polish web portal and online news platform, where he was a picture editor of the home page at that time.

== Career ==
Kudła began his career in 2010 in TVN, one of Poland's major television networks owned by Warner Bros. Discovery, where he prepared news reports for TVN24, a Polish 24-hour commercial news channel, and Fakty TVN, the flagship newscast of TVN. Earlier he had been the picture editor in Onet.pl, the largest Polish web portal.

Kudła was awarded for his journalistic achievements by the Association of Journalists of the Republic of Poland in 2016. He was nominated for the Bolesław Prus Award in 2017.

He was a TV managing editor of the International Festival of Independent Cinema Off Camera from 2018 to 2020.

For his first short documentary film, Depositary (2014), he was awarded on Southampton International Film Festival and has received two nominations on The Best Shorts Competition. His film The Photo Film People (2017) won the Gold Dolphin of the Cannes Corporate Media & TV Awards in France and the Gold Plaque of the Chicago International Film Festival Television Awards in United States.

In 2015 he directed documentary film Wilczur about Jacek Wilczur, member of the Main Commission for the Investigation of Nazi Crimes in Poland, explorer of the Project Riese undergrounds and the Home Army executioner in Holy Cross Mountains.

Kudła is a director and producer of film Polanski, Horowitz. Hometown, with Oscar-winning director Roman Polanski's and New York photographer Ryszard Horowitz's participation, about their early life in Kraków Ghetto during the Holocaust and after the war in Poland.

He co-founded a KRK FILM production house.

== Volunteering ==
He is a Meritorious Honorary Blood Donor awarded by the Polish Red Cross.

== Filmography ==
Director and producer

- Polanski, Horowitz. Hometown – a KRK FILM production (2021)
- The Photo Film People – a TVN production (2017)
- Wilczur – a TVN production (2015)
- Depositary – a TVN production (2014)

== Awards ==
=== Film ===
- Polish Film Award nomination in the Best Documentary category for the Polanski, Horowitz. Hometown (Poland, 2022)
- Polish Film Award nomination in the Discovery of the Year category for the Polanski, Horowitz. Hometown (Poland, 2022)
- The Audience Choice on the Polish Film Festival in Perth for the Polanski, Horowitz. Hometown (Australia, 2022)
- The Krzysztof Kieślowski "Beyond Borders" award on the New York Polish Film Festival for the Polanski, Horowitz. Hometown (United States, 2022)
- "The Portraits" Jury Award of the Kraków and the World magazine for the Polanski, Horowitz. Hometown (Poland, 2022)
- The Award of the Kraków Chamber of Commerce and Industry for the Polanski, Horowitz. Hometown (Poland, 2022))
- Audience Award of the Two Riversides Film and Art Festival for the Polanski, Horowitz. Hometown (Poland, 2021)
- Audience Award of the Krakow Film Festival for the Polanski, Horowitz. Hometown (Poland, 2021)
- Special Mention in the National Competition of the Krakow Film Festival for the Polanski, Horowitz. Hometown (Poland, 2021)
- Gold Dolphin of the Cannes Corporate Media & TV Awards for The Photo Film People (France, 2017)
- Gold Plaque of the Chicago International Film Festival Television Awards for The Photo Film People (United States, 2017)
- Humanitarian Honorable Mention of the Best Shorts Competition Humanitarian Award for the Depositary (United States, 2017)
- Award for editing on Southampton International Film Festival for Depositary (United Kingdom, 2017)
- Award of Merit Special Mention on The Best Shorts Competition for Depositary (United States, 2016)

=== Journalism ===
- The Audience Gold BohaterOn for the History Hiking (Poland, 2020)
- The Bronze BohaterOn for the History Hiking (Poland, 2020)
- Bolesław Prus Award nomination by the Association of Journalists of the Republic of Poland (Poland, 2017)
- Green Pear for outstanding journalistic achievements by the Association of Journalists of the Republic of Poland in Kraków (Poland, 2016)

=== Other ===
- The Silver Creator Award for History Hiking (2020)
