= El Comercio (Ecuador) =

Newspaper from Ecuador

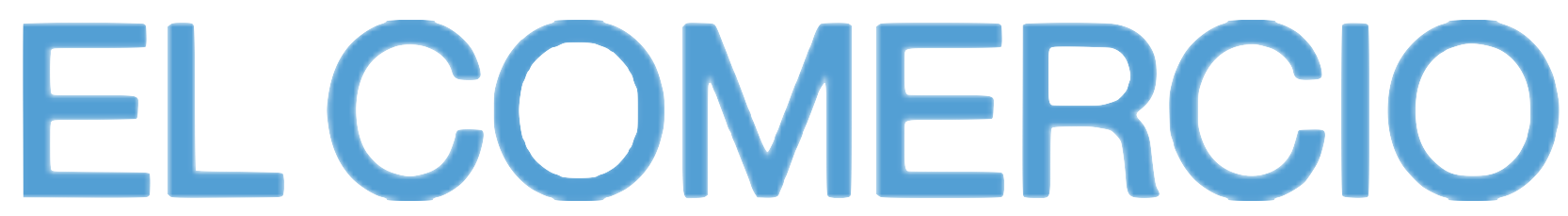
- Type: Daily newspaper
- Format: Broadsheet
- Owner: Grupo El Comercio C. A.
- Editor-in-chief: None
- Editor: None
- Founded: 1906
- Political alignment: Center-right; Conservative
- Language: Spanish
- Headquarters: Avenida Pedro Vicente Maldonado 11515. Quito, Ecuador
- Circulation: 40.000 Daily; 78.000 Sunday
- Price: USD 0.35 Monday - Friday; USD 0.60 Saturday; USD 0.90 Sunday -local prices-
- Website: elcomercio.com

El Comercio is a daily Ecuadorian newspaper in Quito. It covers news from inside and outside the country, although its focus is primarily on the former, especially on Quito, Guayaquil and occasionally Cuenca. It competes against El Universo for the largest print distribution in Ecuador.

== History ==
The paper was founded on January 1, 1906, in Quito, Ecuador by Celiano Monge and brothers César Mantilla Jácome and Carlos Mantilla Jácome. The newspaper remained in the Mantilla family until January 12, 2015, when the newspaper was sold to Telglovisión S.A., company property of the entrepreneur Remigio Ángel González. Currently the Director of the newspaper is Marcos Vaca Morales.

The group also entered the world of television. On February 1, 2016, Televicentro (now TVC), a news television channel owned by Grupo El Comercio, was launched. The frequency granted for the station's broadcast is the subject of controversy regarding irregularities found by the Comptroller General of the Republic of Ecuador.

== Sections ==
The main sections and supplements are Politics, Opinion, Law, Business, Sports, Quito, Ecuador, World, Society, Culture, Family, Education, Blogs, among others.
