= Adam Dulęba =

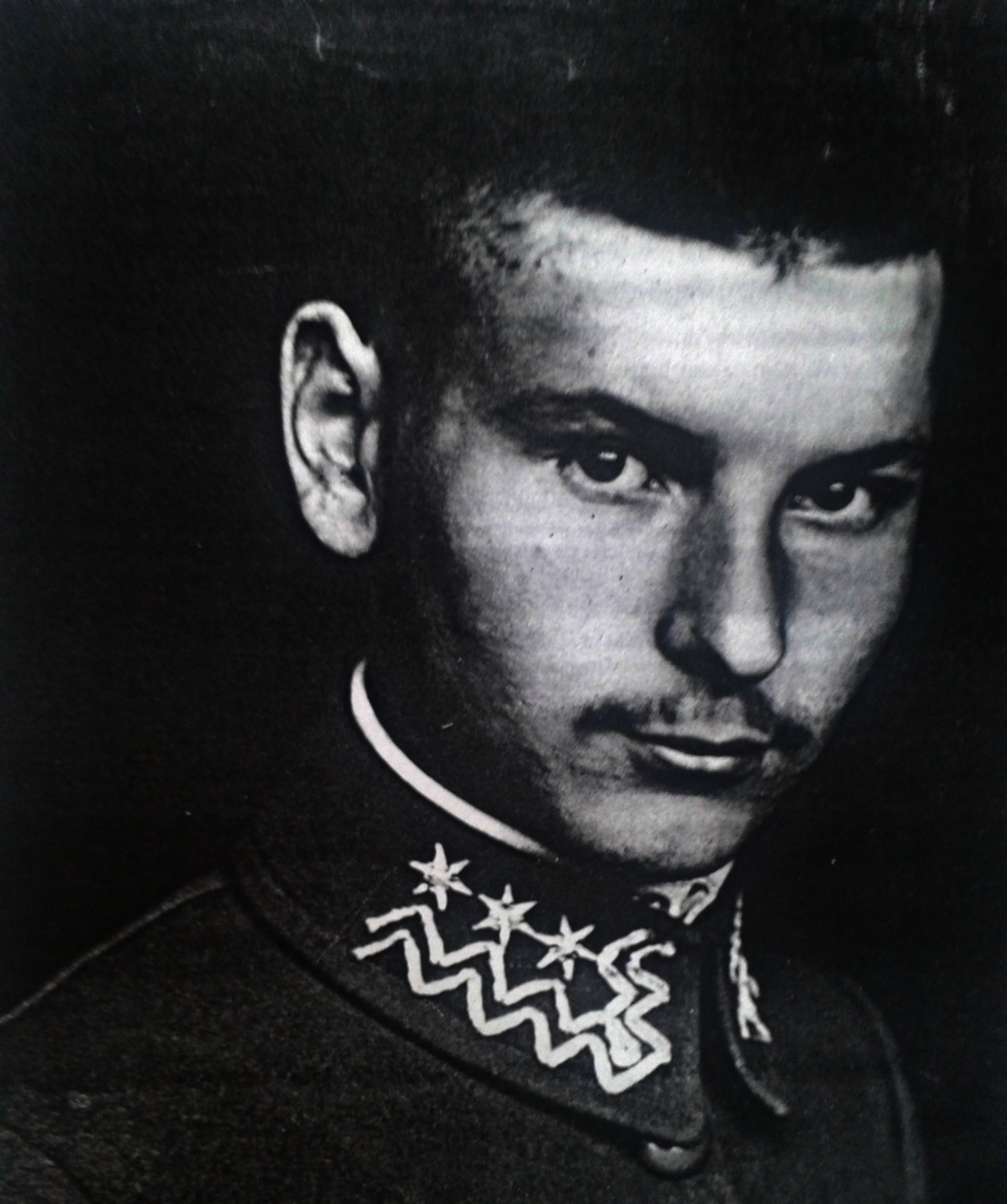
- Adam Dulęba in Polish Legions
- Born: Adam Franciszek Mikołaj Dulęba; 6 December 1895; Saybusch, Austria-Hungary
- Died: 13 March 1944 (aged 48); Gross-Rosen concentration camp, Lower Silesia
- Occupation: Photographer

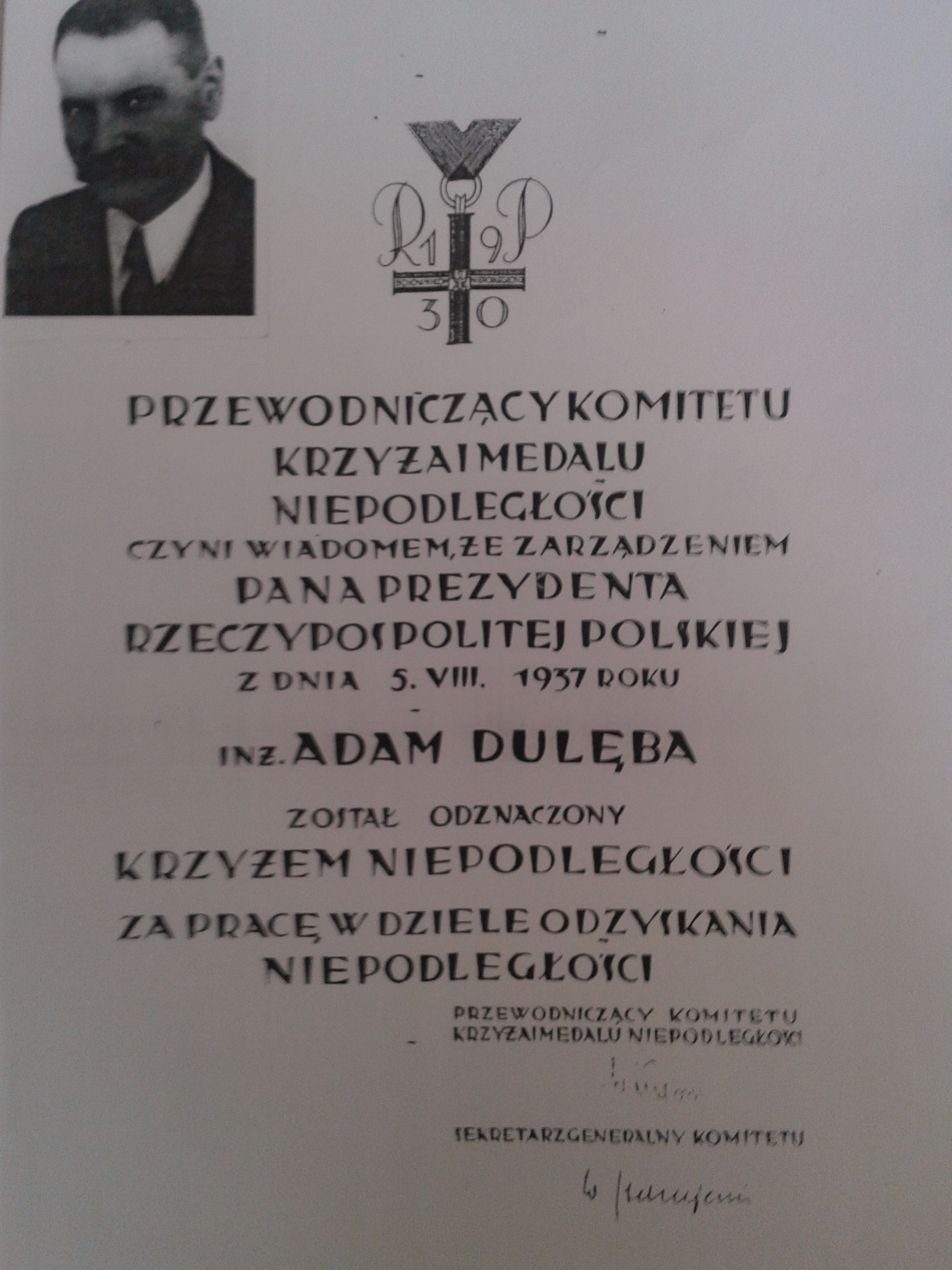
A certificate stating that Adam Dulęba had been awarded the Cross of Independence on 5 August 1937.

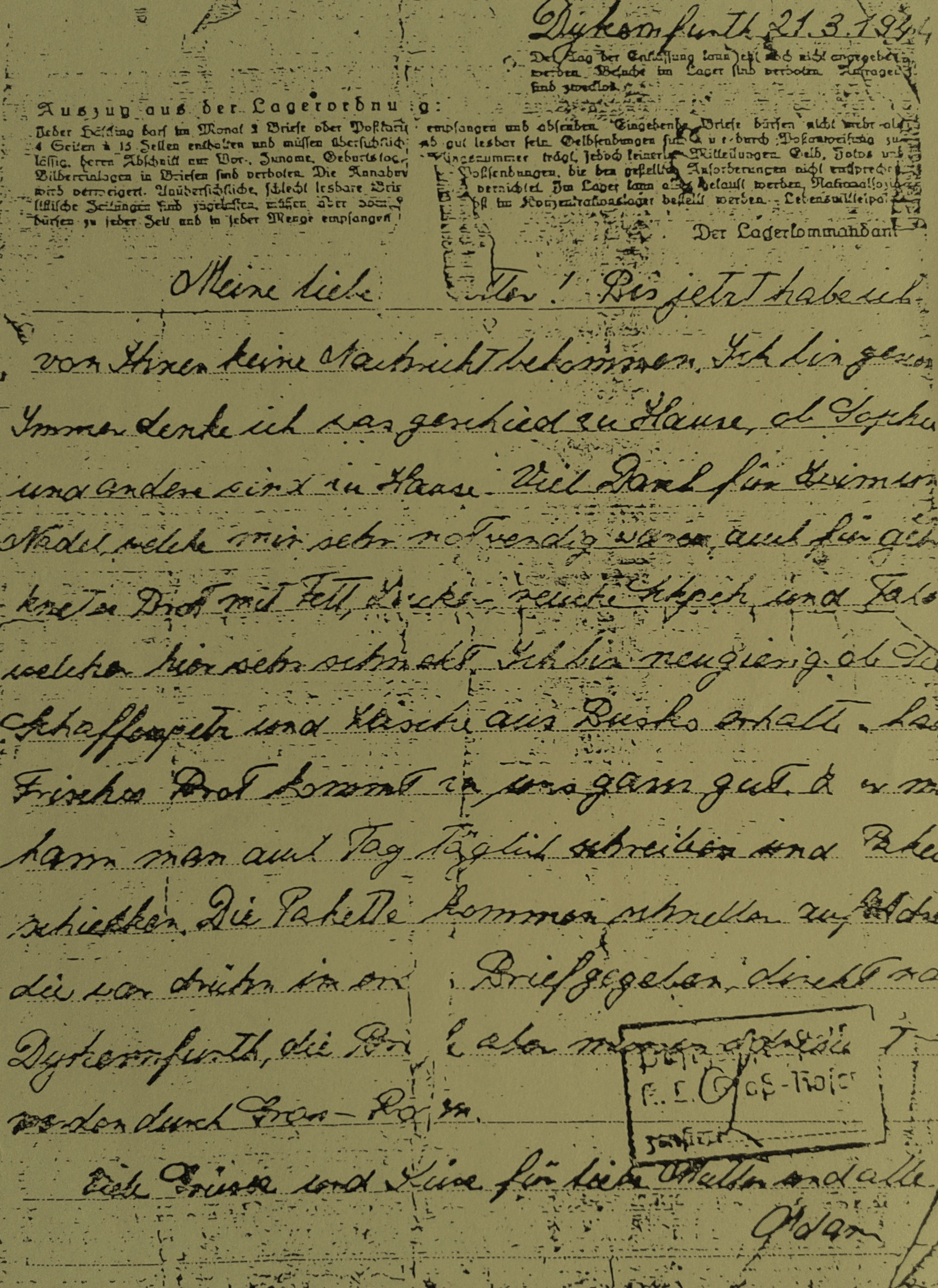
Adam Dulęba's final letter, sent from the Gross-Rosen concentration camp in March 1944.

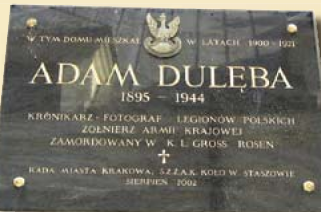
A memorial plaque, which was revealed in 2002, located on Adam Dulęba's childhood home at Poselska Street in Kraków.

Adam Franciszek Mikołaj Dulęba (6 December 1895 – end of March 1944 in the Gross-Rosen concentration camp) was a Polish photographer, officer of the Polish Legions, soldier of Armia Krajowa; known under the pseudonym Góral. Adam Dulęba was the photographer and chronicler of the Polish Legions. He photographed, among others, Józef Piłsudski and Edward Rydz-Śmigły. He was awarded the Cross of Independence on 5 August 1937.

== Work as a photographer ==
During his service in the Polish Legions Dulęba worked at the press office of the Legions' headquarters. He photographed and documented everyday life of the soldiers stationed there. Dulęba's pictures had preserved not only military marches, but also battle preparations and the battles themselves, everyday activities of Marshal Józef Piłsudski, patriotic manifestations and funerals of soldiers of the First Brigade. His photographs had immortalized the following figures: Edward Rydz-Śmigły, Kazimierz Sosnkowski, Józef Haller, Władysław Sikorski together with aforementioned Józef Piłsudski. In 1916, part of those photographs had already been printed in a limited edition photo album called "Legionowo", which was self-published by Adam Dulęba. Today, Adam Dulęba's photo album is no longer available for sale.

== Biography ==
Adam Dulęba was born in Żywiec. He was the son of an official from Kraków, Franciszek Ksawery Dulęba. Adam's children, who are still alive to this day, say that Adam had inherited a passion for photography from his father.

When Adam was five years old, his whole family moved permanently to Kraków. When Adam was 19, he joined the Polish Legions immediately after graduating from school. He only left a short note for his parents: "I'm going to serve our motherland".

Right after joining the Legions, Adam Dulęba began working at the Legions' press office. After the war, in 1918, he began studying at the Jagiellonian University in Kraków, Faculty of Arts, where he had studied agriculture, and eventually received an engineering degree. During his studies he decided to take up the mandatory agricultural practices in the country. He chose Niziny, a village in Busko County. In Niziny, he met Zofia Zaporska, a young lady from a good family. After Zofia graduated from a school for young ladies, she married Adam.

Their wedding ceremony was held on 20 July 1920 in Tuczępy. A few months later, as a result of a transaction between Adam Dulęba's father-in-law and a local noble from the Radziwiłł family, Adam and Zofia became owners of a 30-hectare farm in Łubnice (located in Staszów County). The young couple then moved in and settled at that farm.

One year after the wedding (5 August 1921) first son of Adam and Zofia was born, and they called him Władysław Adam Antoni. In two years' time (10 July 1923) a daughter was born to the couple – Janina (diminutive – "Ela"). Their third child, Henryk Tadeusz, was born on 15 September 1924; during his youth he suffered an unfortunate motorcycle accident and, in addition to extensive fractures, suffered a serious injury to the spine and skull. Janusz Antoni Dulęba, their fourth and last child, was born 17 October 1928. The children, except Henryk Tadeusz, are still alive to this day. After World War I, Adam and Zofia Dulęba, together with their children, had lived off the income from an agricultural farm and a dairy plant founded by Adam Dulęba in Łubnice.

== The shootout at Dulęba's home ==
On Friday, 21 January 1944, Adam Dulęba was celebrating his son Henryk's name-day, together with his family and invited guests, at his home in Łubnice. Many people gathered at the party, including Stanisław Wiącek, a second-in-command of Jędrusie, and a soldier of that group, Edward Kabata. Later that night, Schutzstaffel soldiers unexpectedly showed up at Adam Dulęba's home. One of the Germans stood in the doorway, readying his gun. When he saw that members of Jędrusie were inside, he ordered the other SS soldiers to open fire. The guerrillas, though wounded in the ensuing gunfight, managed to escape. Zygmunt Marcinkowski was shot that night, and Władysław Romański was heavily wounded and would soon be murdered in Busko-Zdrój. Adam Dulęba himself was captured and almost immediately taken by the Germans to the Gross-Rosen concentration camp where he was killed later that year.

After the shootout, all of the valuables belonging to the Dulęba family were stolen and taken deep into German territory. Despite many efforts, Adam's children were unable to return any of the stolen items to Łubnice. Shortly before his death, Adam Dulęba, the father of four children, managed to write a letter to his family. In this letter, written in German, he assures his family that he is in good health and would soon return home to Łubnice. However, he never returned from the camp.

== Death ==
At the end of March 1944 sixty-two prisoners of the Gross-Rosen concentration camp were transported to the nearby Schutzstaffel headquarters. In the so-called "wełecki forest" they were brutally executed. It is believed that Adam Dulęba was among the prisoners murdered there. However, that event is not documented and the only evidence are the memories of people who had lived then. Another version of the events is more likely to have happened: namely, Dulęba was shot in Rogoźnica, the town in which the Gross-Rosen concentration camp was located. In his final letter, dated 21 March 1944, Adam Dulęba describes his backbreaking work at the Nazi camp. He was one of the prisoners who, shortly before their deaths, were forced to work at the camp's quarry, mining granite.

== Trivia ==
Adam Dulęba was not indifferent towards the fate of those less fortunate. After publishing "Legionowo" he decided to donate a portion of his earnings to the families that were affected by war and had lost their close relatives. Adam Dulęba was also an active social-worker. He had participated, amongst others, in organizing a District Cooperative Dairy Plant in Łubnice. A large part of the income from selling the photo album documenting his service in the Legions was spent on helping the families of soldiers who had fallen in World War I.

== Adam Dulęba's photographs ==
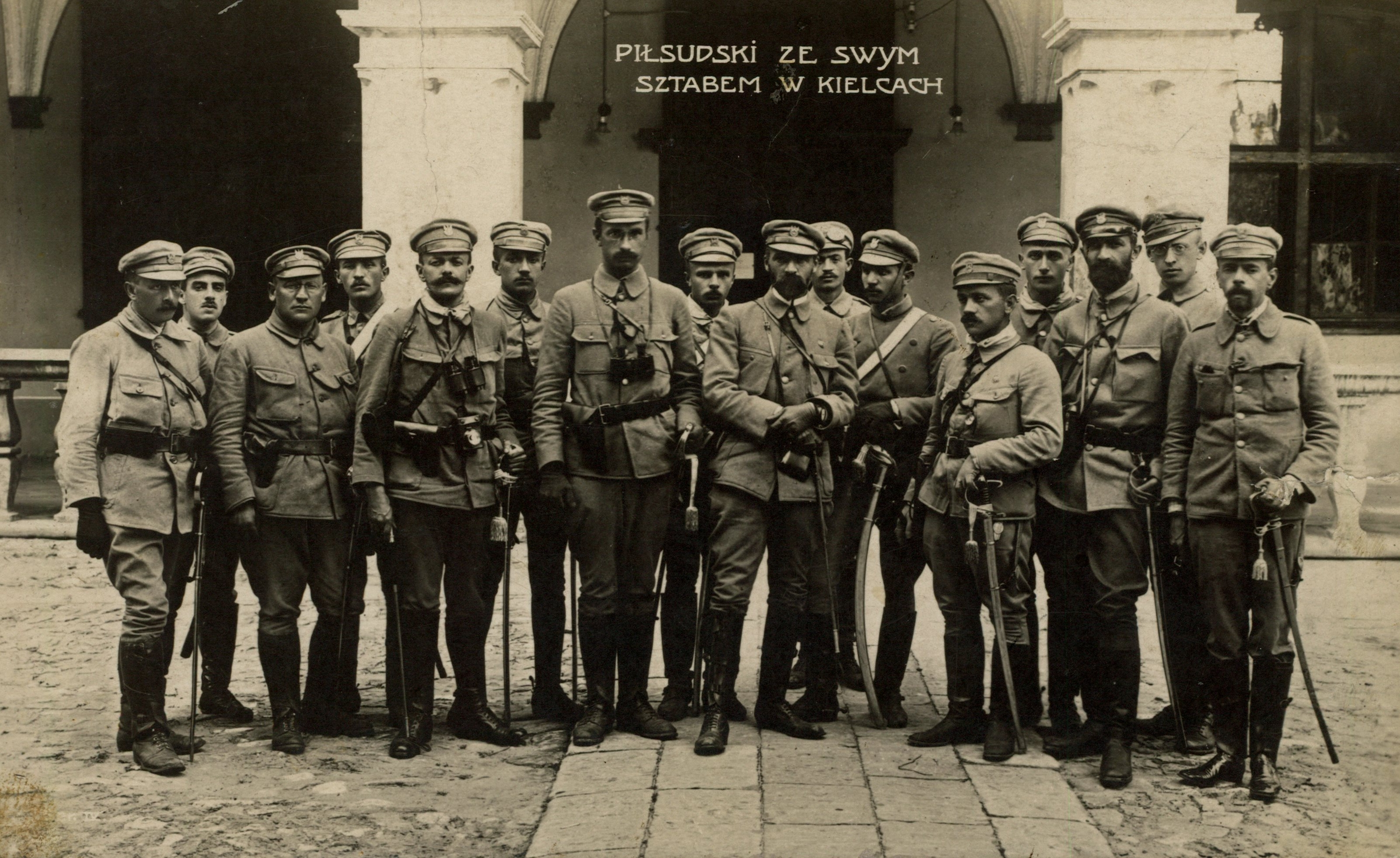

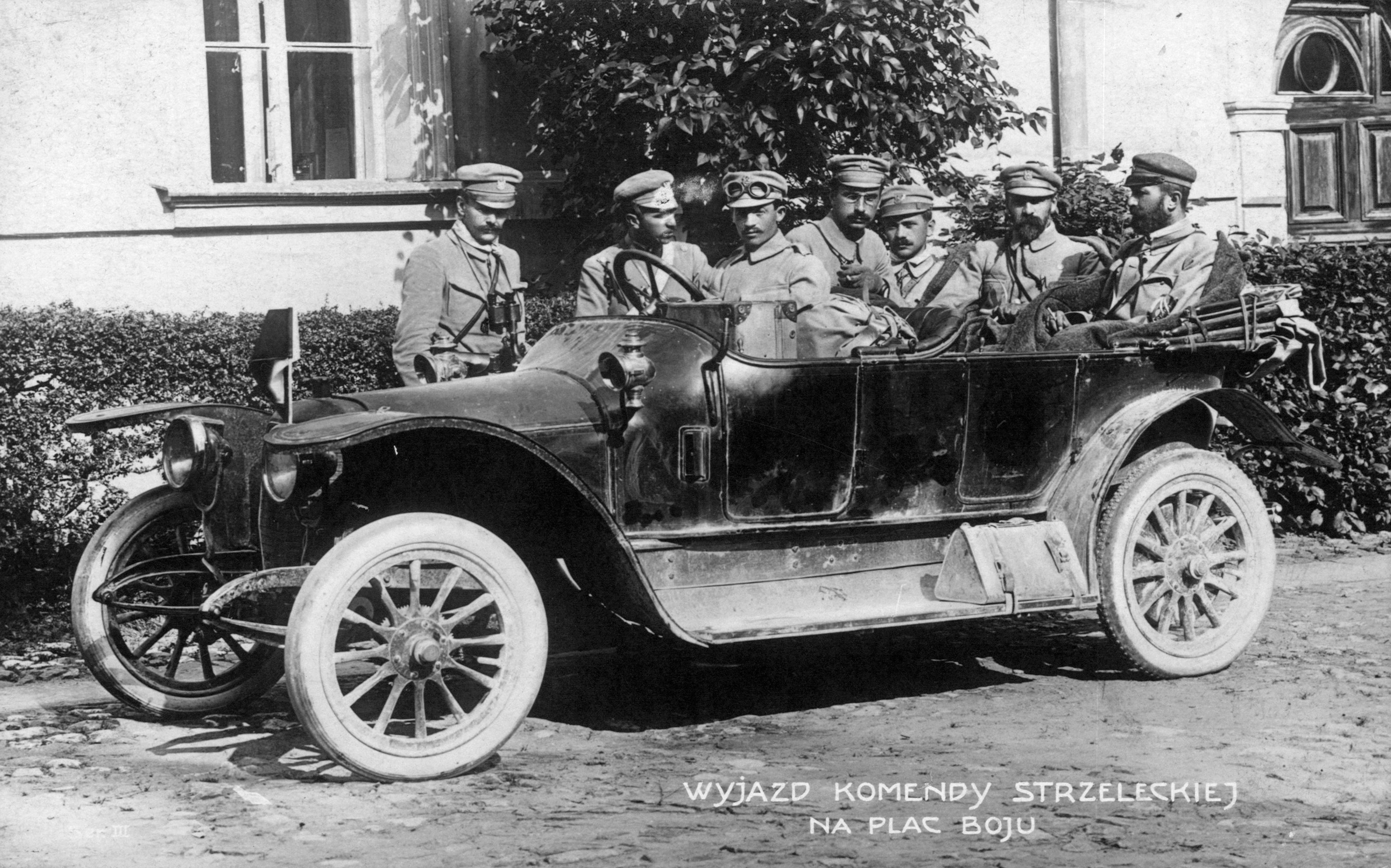

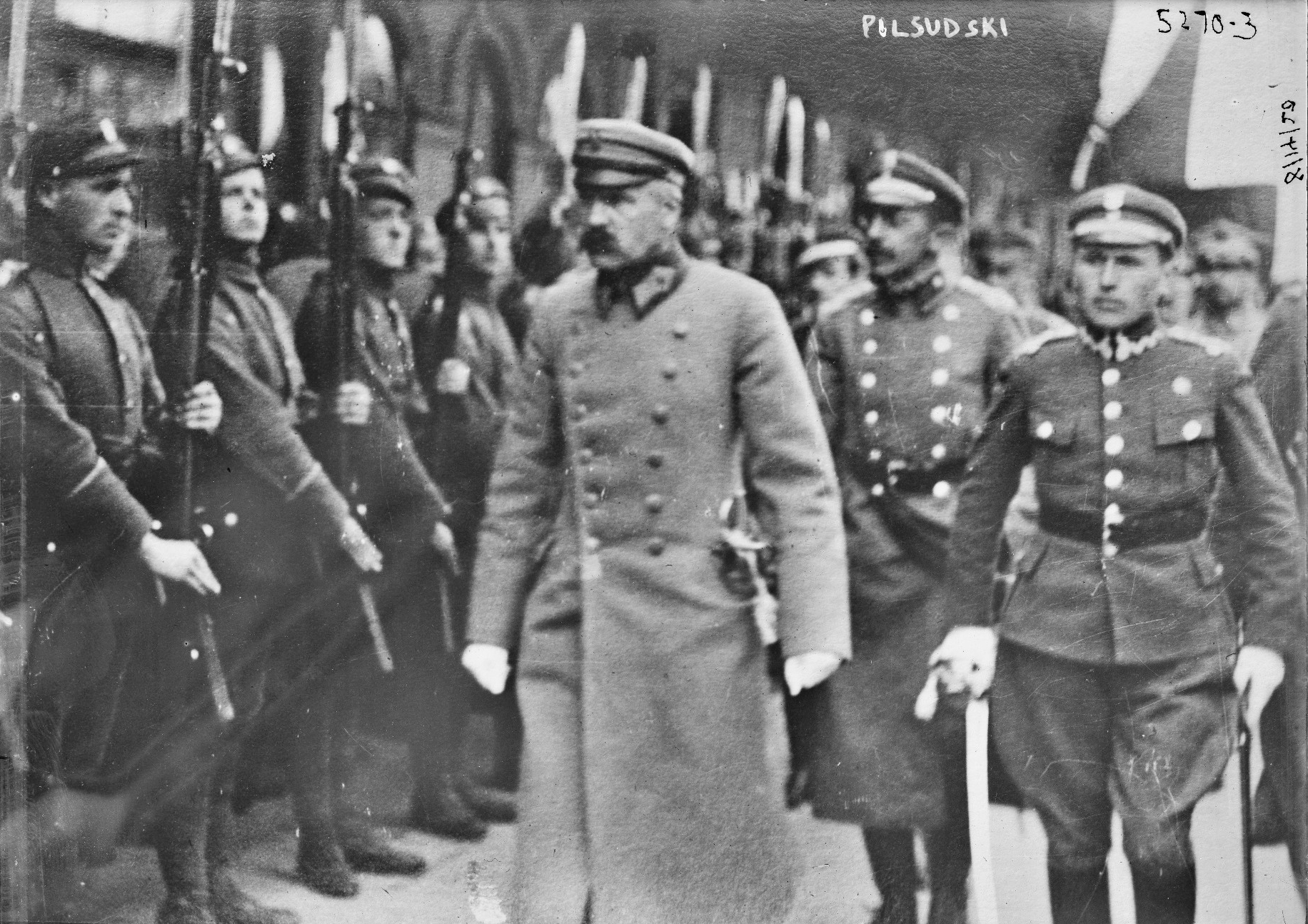

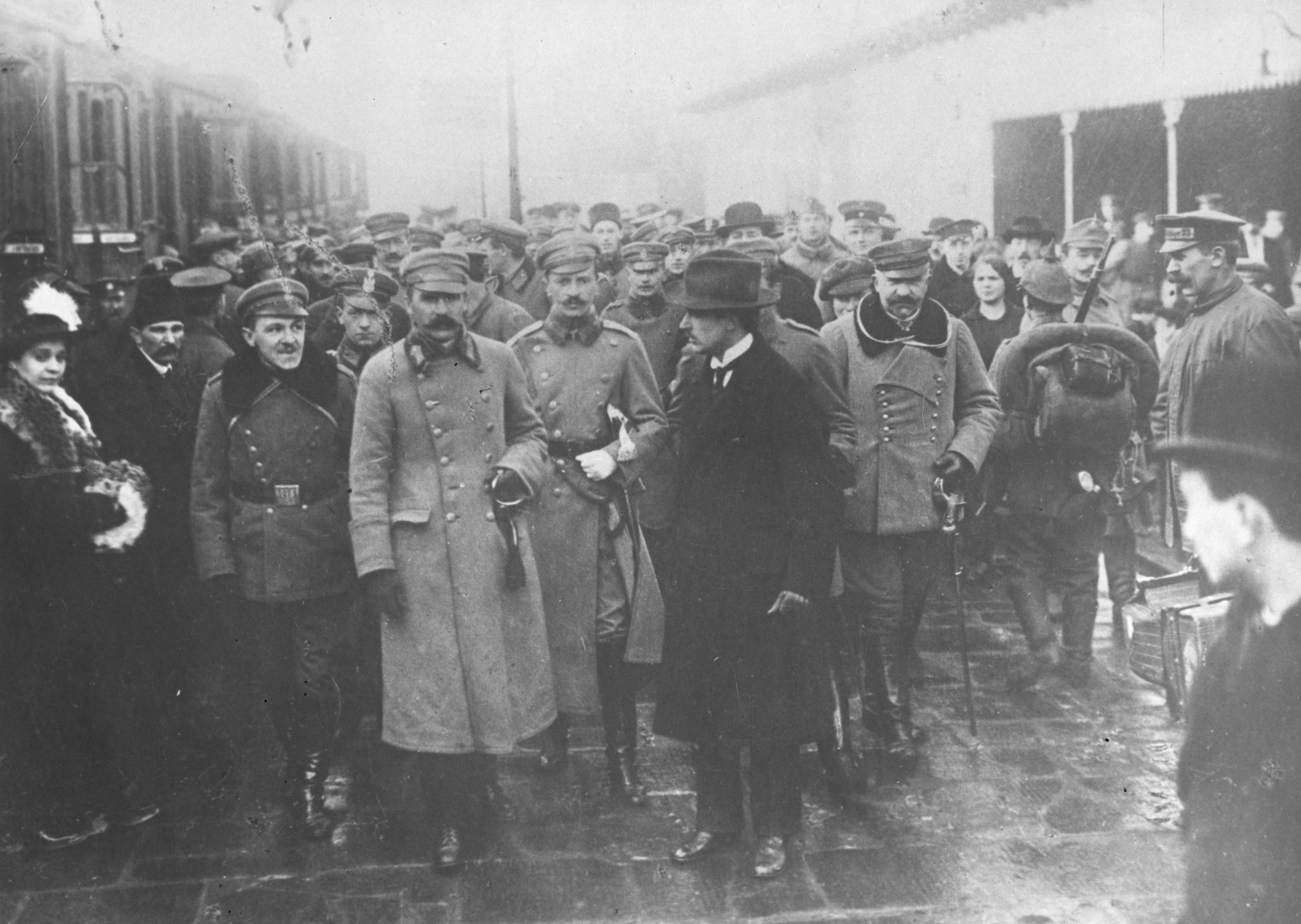

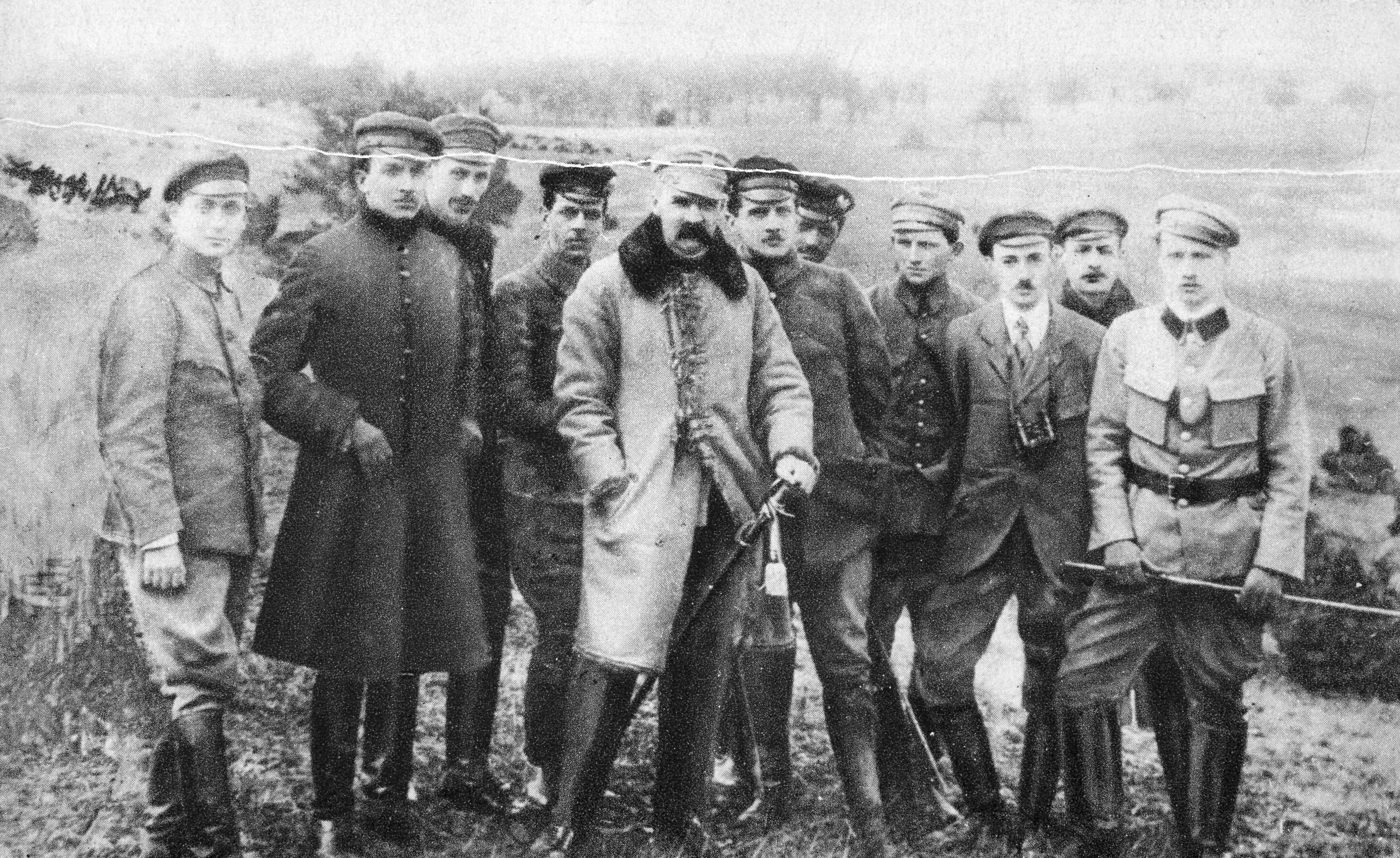

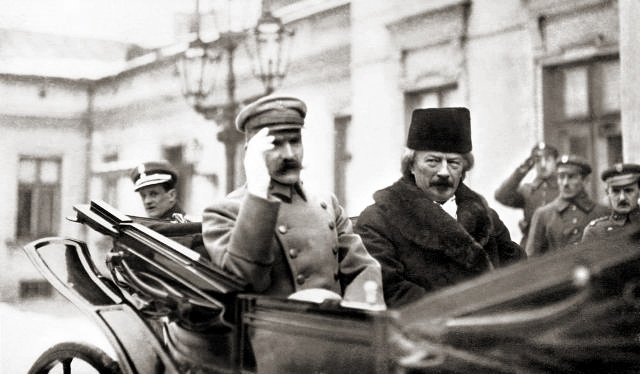

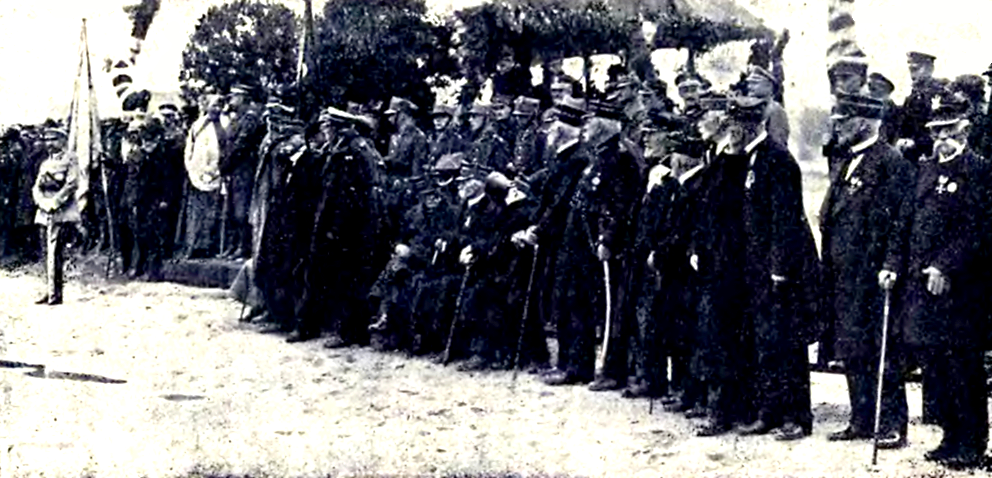

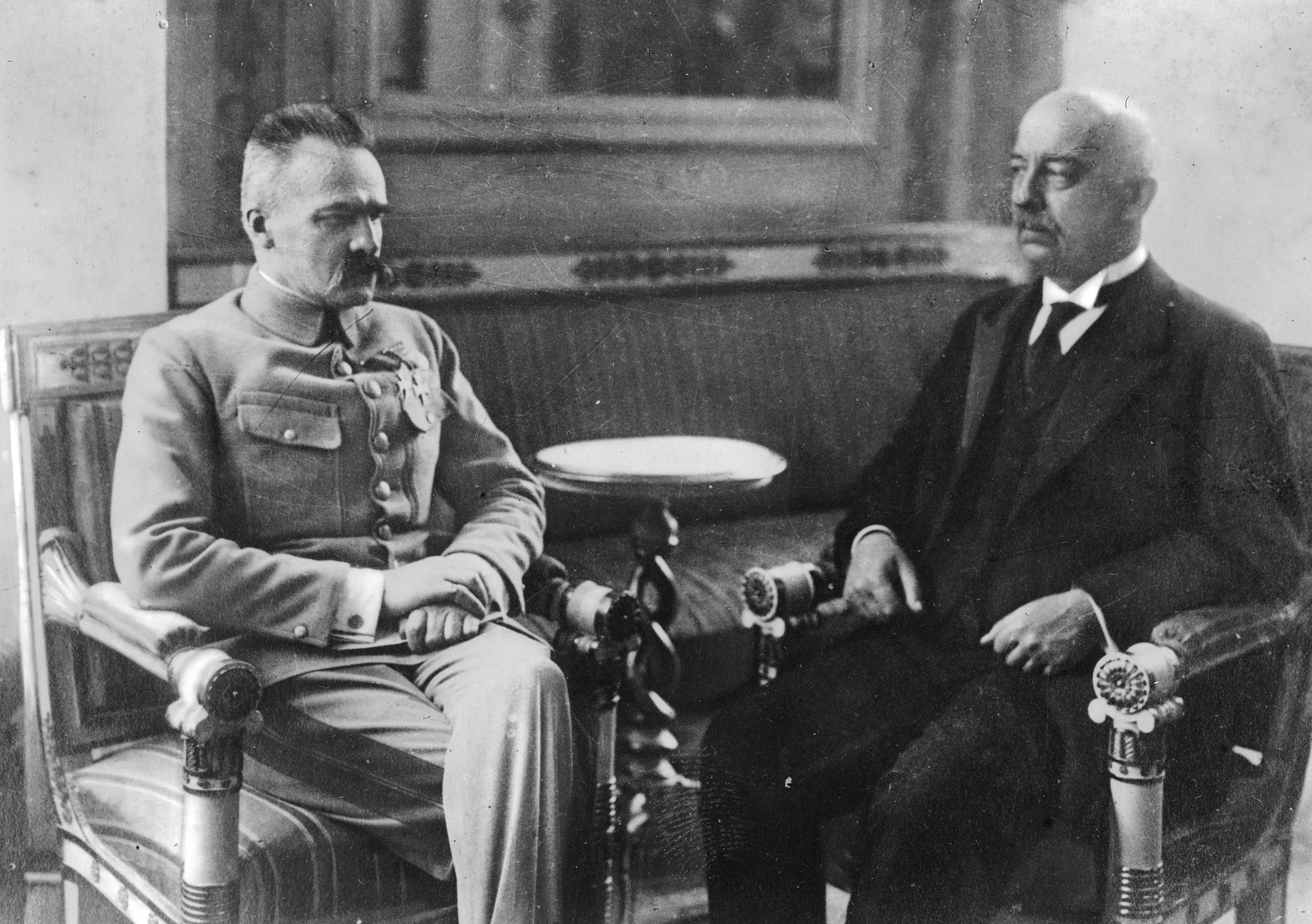
