= Grzymała =

Grzymała may refer to:

- Grzymała (surname)
- Grzymała, Pomeranian Voivodeship (north Poland)
- Grzymała, Świętokrzyskie Voivodeship (south Poland)
- Grzymała coat-of-arms
