= Sachalin =

Sachalin may refer to the following villages:

- Sachalin, Lublin Voivodeship (east Poland)
- Sachalin, Świętokrzyskie Voivodeship (south-central Poland)
- Sachalin (Piotrków Pierwszy), a village in Lublin County, Lublin Voivodeship, in eastern Poland

For the Russian (ex-Japanese) island, see Sakhalin.
