= Jarosławice, Świętokrzyskie Voivodeship =

Jarosławice
- Village
- Location within Poland
- Coordinates: 50°29′50″N 21°2′19″E
- Country: Poland
- Voivodeship: Świętokrzyskie
- County: Busko
- Gmina: Tuczępy
- Population: 410

Jarosławice [jarɔswaˈvit͡sɛ] is a village in the administrative district of Gmina Tuczępy, within Busko County, Świętokrzyskie Voivodeship, in south-central Poland. It lies approximately 4 km (2 mi) south-east of Tuczępy, 24 km (15 mi) east of Busko-Zdrój, and 53 km (33 mi) south-east of the regional capital Kielce.
