= Rzędów =

- Village
- Location within Poland
- Coordinates: 50°31′33″N 21°3′18″E
- Country: Poland
- Voivodeship: Świętokrzyskie
- County: Busko
- Gmina: Tuczępy

Rzędów [ˈʐɛnduf] is a village in the administrative district of Gmina Tuczępy, within Busko County, Świętokrzyskie Voivodeship, in south-central Poland. It lies approximately 5 km (3 mi) east of Tuczępy, 25 km (16 mi) east of Busko-Zdrój, and 51 km (32 mi) south-east of the regional capital Kielce.
