= Nieciesławice =

- Village
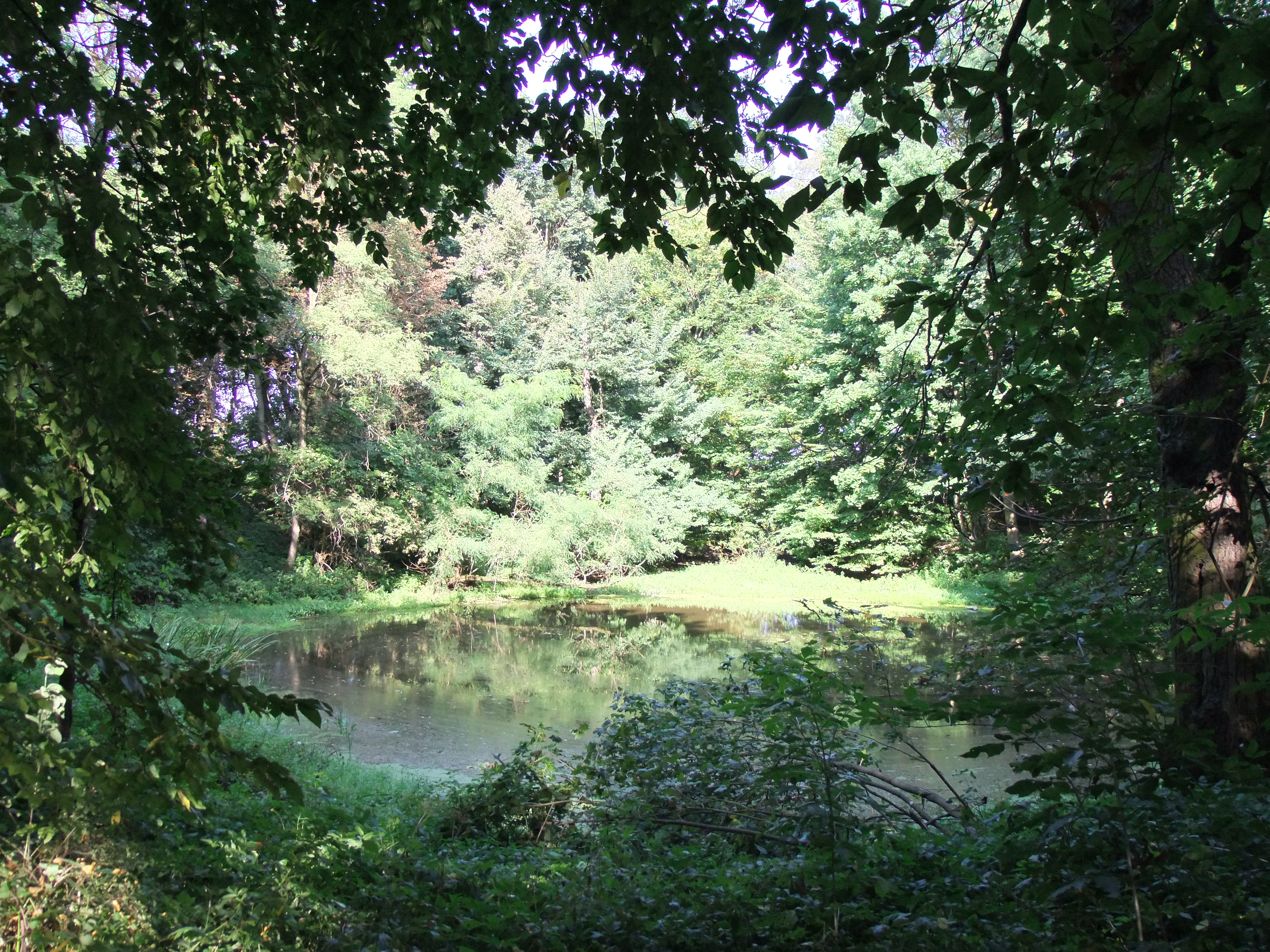
- Park

- Location within Poland
- Coordinates: 50°30′3″N 21°0′59″E
- Country: Poland
- Voivodeship: Świętokrzyskie
- County: Busko
- Gmina: Tuczępy

Nieciesławice [ɲɛt͡ɕɛswaˈvit͡sɛ] is a village in the administrative district of Gmina Tuczępy, within Busko County, Świętokrzyskie Voivodeship, in south-central Poland. It lies approximately 3 km (2 mi) south-east of Tuczępy, 22 km (14 mi) east of Busko-Zdrój, and 51 km (32 mi) south-east of the regional capital Kielce.
