= Góra, Busko County =

Góra
- Village
- Location within Poland
- Coordinates: 50°30′59″N 21°1′6″E
- Country: Poland
- Voivodeship: Świętokrzyskie
- County: Busko
- Gmina: Tuczępy
- Population: 280

Góra [ˈɡura] is a village in the administrative district of Gmina Tuczępy, within Busko County, Świętokrzyskie Voivodeship, in south-central Poland. It lies approximately 2 km (1 mi) east of Tuczępy, 23 km (14 mi) east of Busko-Zdrój, and 50 km (31 mi) south-east of the regional capital Kielce.
