= Januszkowice =

Januszkowice may refer to the following places in Poland:

- Januszkowice, Lower Silesian Voivodeship (south-west Poland)
- Januszkowice, Subcarpathian Voivodeship (south-east Poland)
- Januszkowice, Świętokrzyskie Voivodeship (south-central Poland)
- Januszkowice, Opole Voivodeship (south-west Poland)
