= Podlesie, Busko County =

Podlesie
- Village
- Location within Poland
- Coordinates: 50°32′2″N 20°59′28″E
- Country: Poland
- Voivodeship: Świętokrzyskie
- County: Busko
- Gmina: Tuczępy

Podlesie [pɔdˈlɛɕɛ] is a village in the administrative district of Gmina Tuczępy, within Busko County, Świętokrzyskie Voivodeship, in south-central Poland. It lies approximately 2 km (1 mi) north of Tuczępy, 21 km (13 mi) east of Busko-Zdrój, and 47 km (29 mi) south-east of the regional capital Kielce.
