= Wierzbica, Busko County =

Wierzbica
- Village
- Location within Poland
- Coordinates: 50°31′51″N 21°0′50″E
- Country: Poland
- Voivodeship: Świętokrzyskie
- County: Busko
- Gmina: Tuczępy
- Population: 230

Wierzbica [vjɛʐˈbit͡sa] is a village in the administrative district of Gmina Tuczępy, within Busko County, Świętokrzyskie Voivodeship, in south-central Poland. It lies approximately 3 km (2 mi) north-east of Tuczępy, 23 km (14 mi) east of Busko-Zdrój, and 49 km (30 mi) south-east of the regional capital Kielce.
