= Gross-Rosen concentration camp =

Concentration camps in Nazi Germany (1940-1945)

Coordinates: 50°59′57″N 16°16′40″E

Gross-Rosen
- Nazi concentration camp
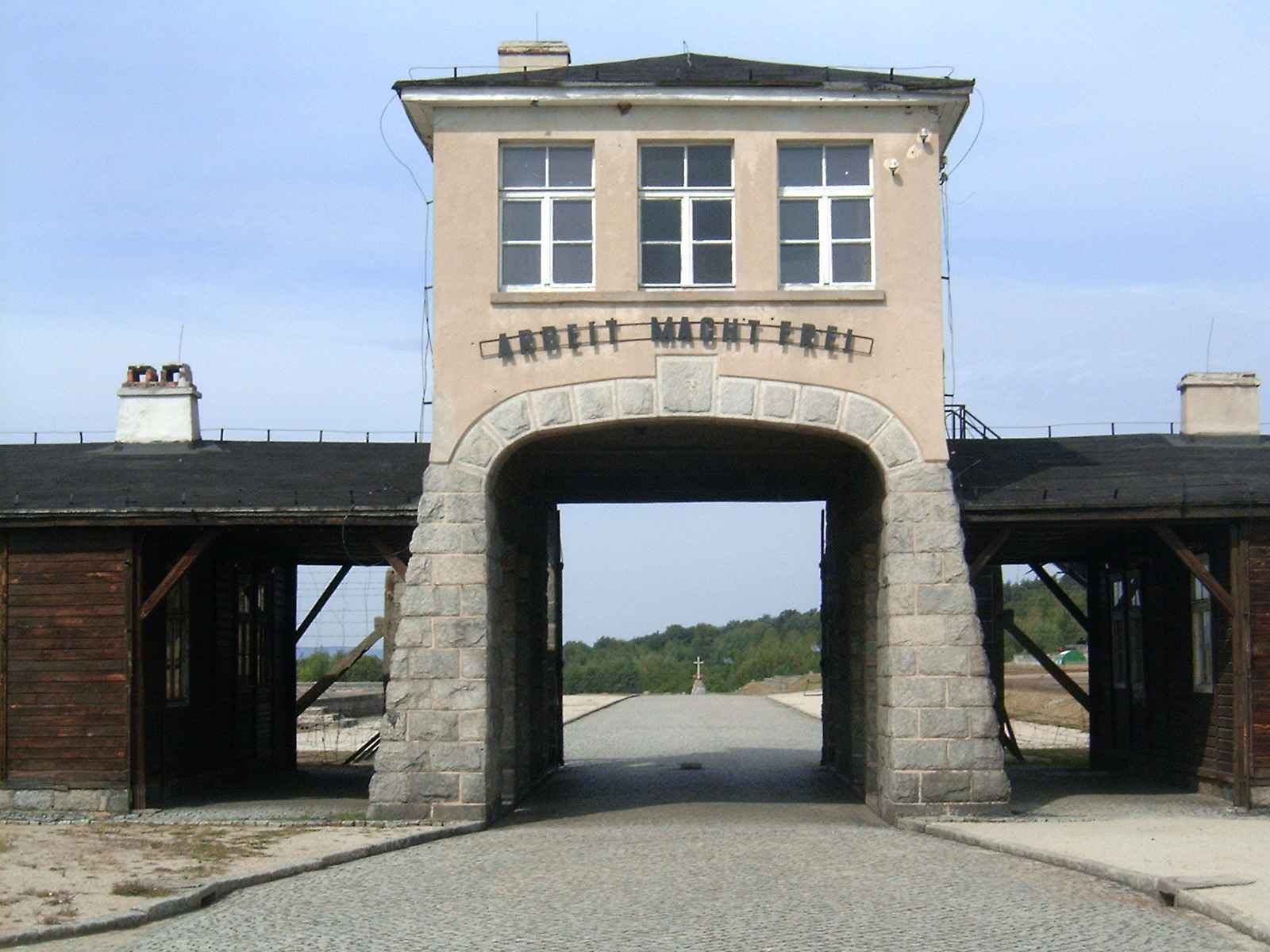
- Gross-Rosen entrance gate with the phrase Arbeit Macht Frei

- Location of Gross-Rosen within Nazi Germany
- Other names: German: Konzentrationslager Groß-Rosen
- Commandant: Arthur Rödl, May 1941 – September 1942; Wilhelm Gideon, September 1942 – October 1943; Johannes Hassebroek, October 1943 until evacuation
- Operational: Summer of 1940 – 14 February 1945
- Inmates: mostly Jews, Poles and Soviet citizens
- Number of inmates: 125,000 (in estimated 100 subcamps)
- Killed: 40,000
- Notable inmates: Boris Braun, Adam Dulęba, Franciszek Duszeńko, Heda Margolius Kovály, Władysław Ślebodziński, Simon Wiesenthal, Rabbi Shlomo Zev Zweigenhaft

Gross-Rosen was a network of Nazi concentration camps built and operated by Nazi Germany during World War II. The main camp was located in the German village of Gross-Rosen, now the modern-day Rogoźnica in Lower Silesian Voivodeship, Poland, directly on the rail-line between the towns of Jawor (Jauer) and Strzegom (Striegau). Its prisoners were mostly Jews, Poles and Soviet citizens.

At its peak activity in 1944, the Gross-Rosen complex had up to 100 subcamps located in eastern Germany and in German-occupied Czechoslovakia and Poland. The population of all Gross-Rosen camps at that time accounted for 11% of the total number of inmates incarcerated in the Nazi concentration camp system.

== The camp ==
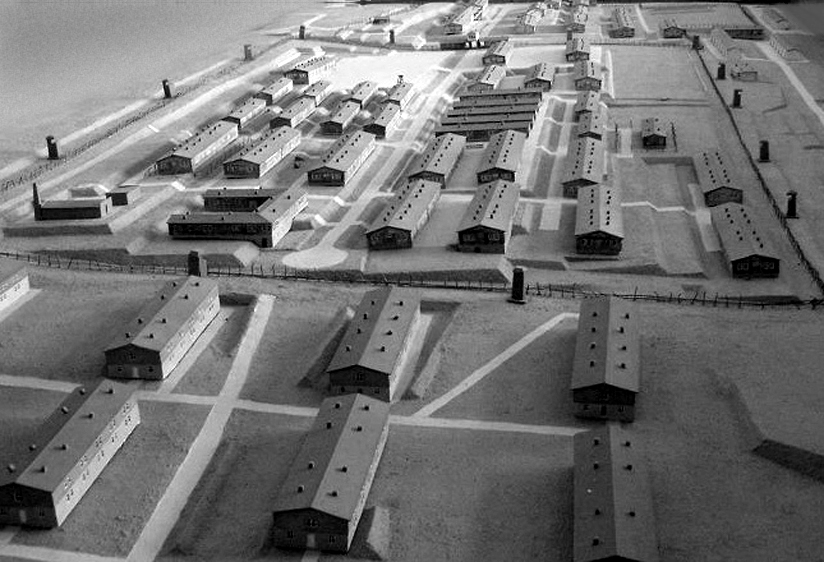
Model of the Gross-Rosen main camp from the Rogoźnica Museum

KZ Gross-Rosen was set up in the summer of 1940 as a satellite camp of the Sachsenhausen concentration camp from Oranienburg. Initially, the slave labour was carried out in a huge stone quarry owned by the SS-Deutsche Erd- und Steinwerke GmbH (SS German Earth and Stone Works). In the fall of 1940 the use of labour in Upper Silesia was taken over by the new Organization Schmelt formed on the orders of Heinrich Himmler. It was named after its leader SS-Oberführer Albrecht Schmelt. The company was put in charge of employment of prisoners from the camps with Jews intended to work for food only.

The Gross-Rosen location, close to occupied Poland, was of considerable advantage. Prisoners were put to work in the construction of a system of subcamps for expellees from the annexed territories. Gross Rosen became an independent camp on 1 May 1941. As the complex grew, the majority of inmates were put to work in the new Nazi enterprises attached to these subcamps.

In October 1941 the SS transferred about 3,000 Soviet POWs to Gross-Rosen for execution by shooting. Gross-Rosen was known for its brutal treatment of the so-called Nacht und Nebel prisoners vanishing without a trace from targeted communities. Most died in the granite quarry. The brutal treatment of the political and Jewish prisoners was not only in the hands of guards and German criminal prisoners brought in by the SS, but to a lesser extent also fuelled by the German administration of the stone quarry responsible for starvation rations and denial of medical help. In 1942, for political prisoners, the average survival time-span was less than two months.

Map of Nazi concentration camps in occupied Poland. Concentration camps are marked by black squares; Gross-Rosen is located on the far left of this map, in the province of Niederschlesien.

Due to a change of policy in August 1942, prisoners were likely to survive longer because they were needed as slave workers in German war industries. Among the companies that benefited from the slave labour of the concentration camp inmates were German electronics manufacturers such as Blaupunkt, Siemens, as well as Krupp, IG Farben, and Daimler-Benz, among others. Some prisoners who were not able to work but not yet dying were sent to the Dachau concentration camp in so-called invalid transports.

The largest population of inmates, however, were Jews, initially from the Dachau and Sachsenhausen camps, and later from Buchenwald. During the camp's existence, the Jewish inmate population came mainly from Poland and Hungary; others were from Belgium, France, Netherlands, Greece, Yugoslavia, Slovakia, and Italy.

Following the unsuccessful Polish Warsaw Uprising of 1944, the Germans deported 3,000 Poles from the Dulag 121 camp in Pruszków, where they were initially imprisoned, to Gross-Rosen. Those Poles were mainly people of 20 to 40 years of age.

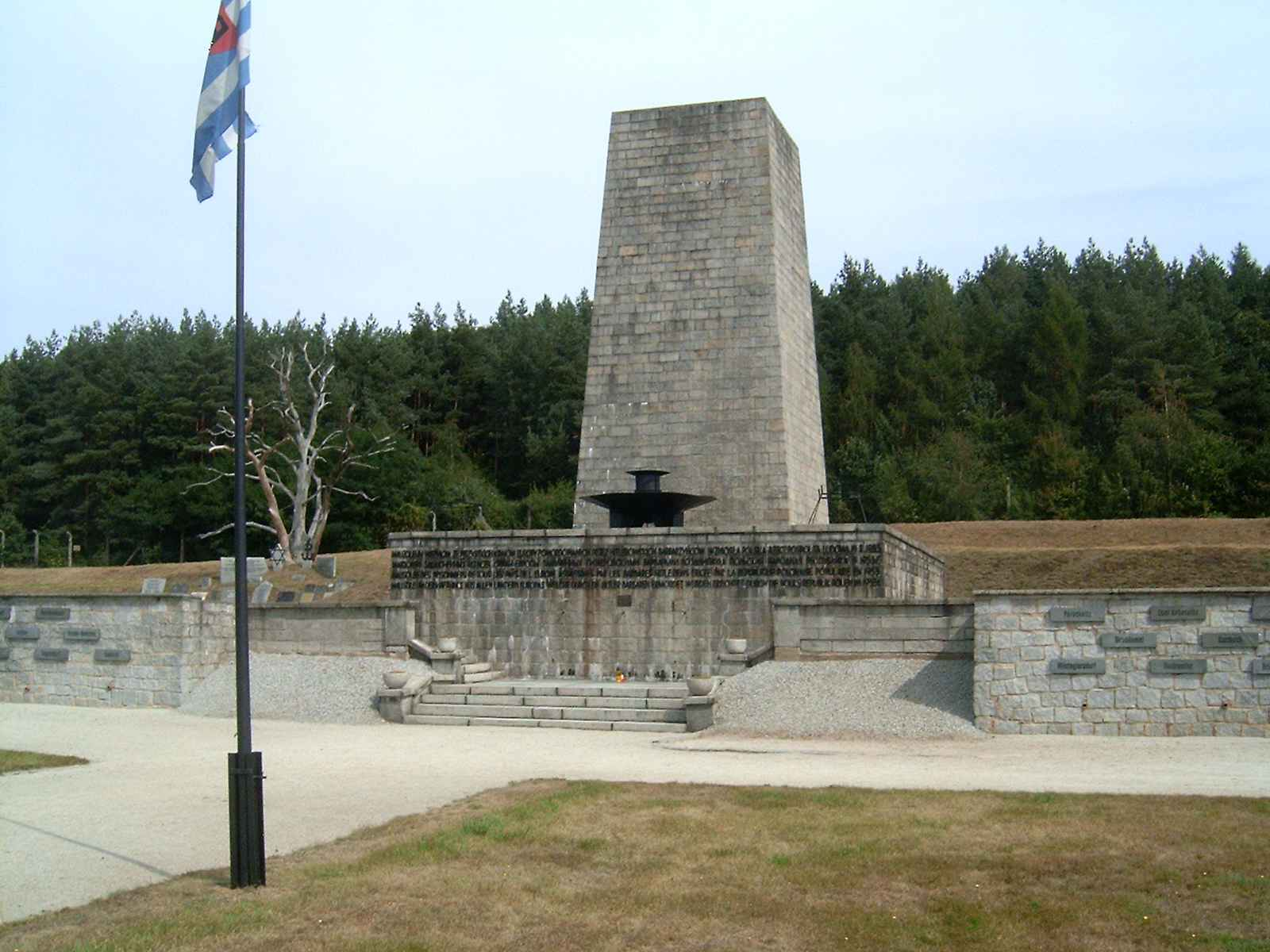
Gross-Rosen memorial

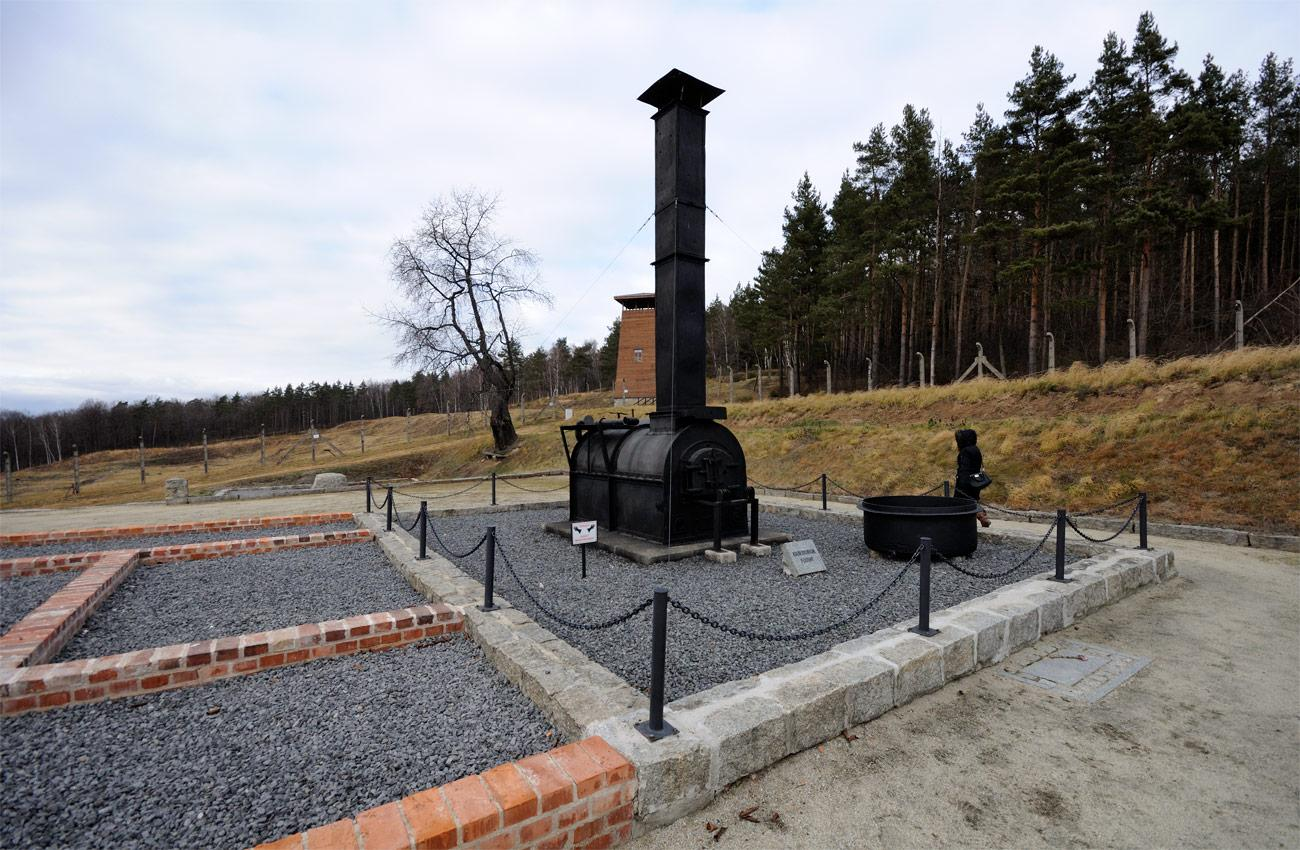
Remains of the crematorium

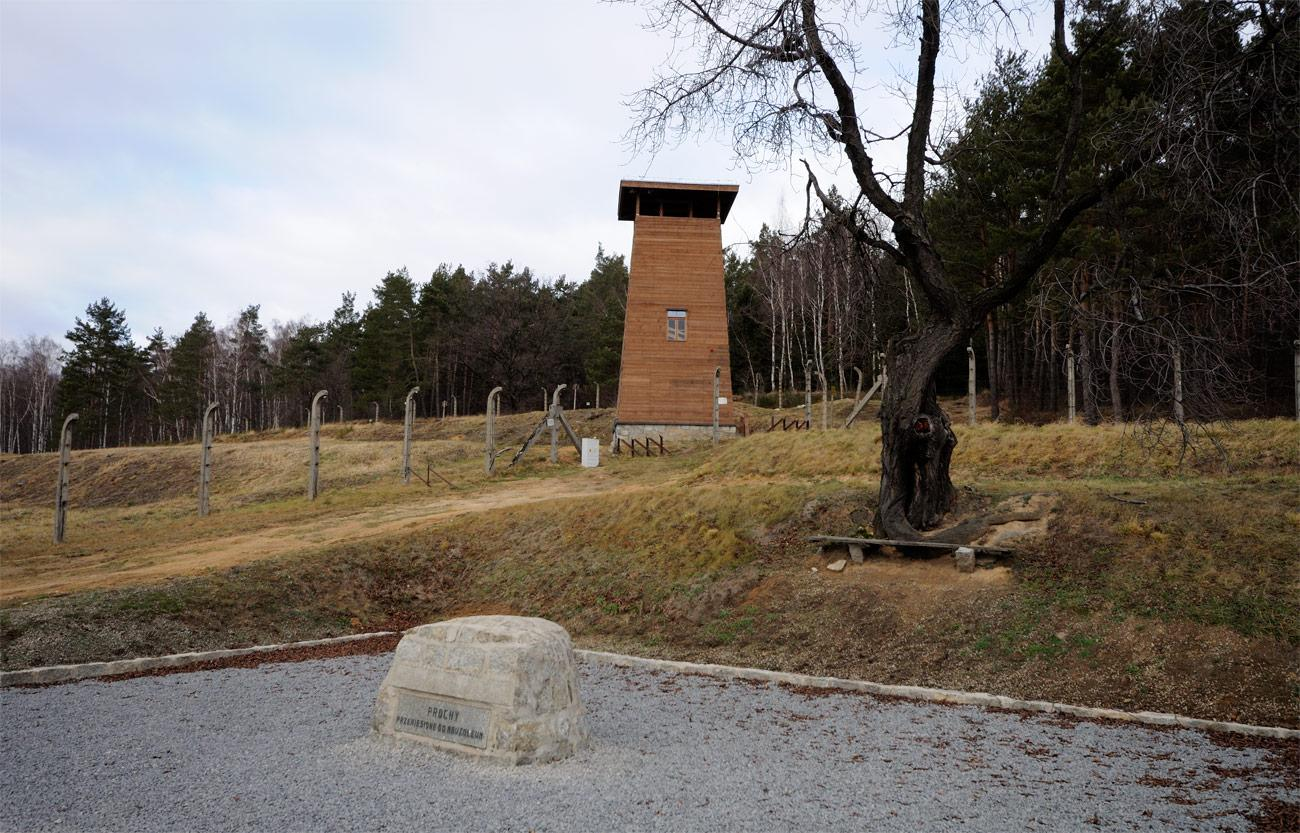
Mass grave of cremated victims

=== Subcamps ===
At its peak activity in 1944, the Gross-Rosen complex had up to 100 subcamps, located in eastern Germany and German-occupied Czechoslovakia and Poland. In its final stage, the population of the Gross-Rosen camps accounted for 11% of the total inmates in Nazi concentration camps at that time. A total of 125,000 inmates of various nationalities passed through the complex during its existence, of whom an estimated 40,000 died on site, on death marches and in evacuation transports. The camp was liberated on 14 February 1945 by the Red Army. A total of over 500 female camp guards were trained and served in the Gross-Rosen complex. Female SS staffed the women's subcamps of Brünnlitz, Graeben, Gruenberg, Gruschwitz Neusalz, Hundsfeld, Kratzau II, Oberaltstadt, Reichenbach, and Schlesiersee Schanzenbau.

The Gabersdorf labour camp had been part of a network of forced labour camps for Jewish prisoners that had operated under Organization Schmelt since 1941. The spinning mill where the female Jewish prisoners worked had been "Aryanized" in 1939 by a Vienna-based company called Vereinigte Textilwerke K. H. Barthel & Co. The prisoners also worked in factories operated by the companies Aloys Haase and J. A. Kluge und Etrich. By 18 March 1944 Gabersdorf had become a subcamp of Gross-Rosen.

One subcamp of Gross-Rosen was the Brünnlitz labor camp, situated in the Czechoslovak village of Brněnec, where Jews rescued by Oskar Schindler were interned.

The Brieg subcamp, located near the village of Pampitz, had originally been the location of a Jewish forced labour camp until August 1944, when the Jewish prisoners were replaced by the first transport of prisoners from the Gross-Rosen main camp. The camp was mostly staffed by soldiers from the Luftwaffe and a few SS members. Most of the prisoners were Polish, with smaller numbers of Russian and Czech prisoners. Most of the Poles had been evacuated from the Pawiak prison in Warsaw; others had been arrested within the territory controlled by the Reich or had been transported from Kraków and Radom.

Brieg's camp kitchen was run by Czech prisoners. The three daily meals included 1 pint of mehlzupa (a soup made from water and meal), 150 grams of bread, 1 quart of soup made with rutabaga, beets, cabbage, kale or sometimes nettles, 1 pint of black "coffee" and a spoonful of molasses. Sometimes "hard workers" called zulaga would be rewarded with a piece of blood sausage or raw horsemeat sausage, jam and margarine. Prisoners also received 1 cup of Knorr soup per week.

=== Camp commandants ===
During the Gross-Rosen initial period of operation as a formal subcamp of Sachsenhausen, the following two SS Lagerführer officers served as the camp commandants, the SS-Untersturmführer Anton Thumann, and SS-Untersturmführer Georg Güßregen. From May 1941 until liberation, the following officials served as commandants of a fully independent concentration camp at Gross-Rosen:

1. SS-Obersturmbannführer Arthur Rödl, May 1941 – September 1942
2. SS-Hauptsturmführer Wilhelm Gideon, September 1942 – October 1943
3. SS-Sturmbannführer Johannes Hassebroek, October 1943 until evacuation

== List of Gross-Rosen subcamps with locations ==
The most far-reaching expansion of the Gross-Rosen system of labour camps took place in 1944 due to accelerated demand for support behind the advancing front. The character and purpose of new camps shifted toward defense infrastructure. In some cities, as in Wrocław (Breslau) camps were established in every other district. It is estimated that their total number reached 100 at that point according to list of their official destinations. The biggest sub-camps included AL Fünfteichen in Jelcz-Laskowice, four camps in Wrocław, Dyhernfurth in Brzeg Dolny, Landeshut in Kamienna Góra, and the entire Project Riese along the Owl Mountains.

== Post-war history ==
After the war, the former camp was under control of the occupying Soviet forces until April 1947, when it was taken over by Polish administration. In 1953, a memorial to the victims designed by Adam Procki was unveiled.

=== War crimes trial ===
On 12 August 1948, the trial of three Gross Rosen camp officials, Johannes Hassebroek, Helmut Eschner and Eduard Drazdauskas, began before a Soviet Military Court. On 7 October 1948, all were found guilty of war crimes. Eschner and Drazdauskas were sentenced to life imprisonment and Hassebroek was sentenced to death, but this was later commuted also to life imprisonment.

=== Museum ===
From the 1950s to 1970s, the former camp was under the care of the Auschwitz-Birkenau State Museum and the Historic Museum of Wrocław. In 1958, the first museum exhibition was created. In 1963, the site of the former camp was added to the Registry of Cultural Property of Poland. In 1976, it became a branch of the District Museum in Wałbrzych. The Gross-Rosen State Museum was opened in 1983, after efforts by survivors from Warsaw and Wrocław.

On 10 May 2002, a ceremony to commemorate 19 officers of the Special Operations Executive murdered by Nazi Germany at Gross-Rosen in 1944, was held at the museum, with the participation of the families of the victims, various Polish officials and war veterans, and ambassadors of the United Kingdom, Canada and France.

Since its creation, the museum has been most visited by Poles, followed by Germans, according to data up to 2013.

== Notable inmates ==
- Boris Braun, Croatian university professor
- Simon Wiesenthal, Nazi hunter. He provides the following information about the camp in his 1967 book The Murderers Among Us:

"... healthy looking prisoners were selected to break in new shoes for soldiers on daily twenty mile marches. Few prisoners survived this ordeal for more than two weeks."

- Władysław Ślebodziński, mathematician who taught prisoners
- Shlomo Zev Zweigenhaft, Rosh Hashochtim of Poland and Chief Rabbi of Hannover and Lower Saxony
- József Debreczeni, author of the memoir, Cold Crematorium
- Franciszek Duszeńko, sculptor, maker of the Treblinka Monument
- Adam Dulęba, Polish Army photographer
- Heda Margolius Kovály, Czech writer and translator
- Philip Markowicz, author of the memoir, My Three Lives
- Lucian Ludwig Kozminski, convicted in the United States of swindling Holocaust survivors of their restitution money and alleged collaborator
- Adolphe Rabinovitch, Special Operations Executive officer.
- Henri Story, Belgian business man, politician and resistance member
- Paul Löbe, former president of the German Reichstag
- Gertruda Sekaninová-Čakrtová, Czechoslovak politician (imprisoned at Kurzbach subcamp)
- Nathan Cassuto, Italian Rabbi and physician
- Paul Johannes Schlesinger, Austrian trade unionist and politician

== See also ==
- List of Nazi-German concentration camps
- List of subcamps of Gross Rosen
- The Holocaust in Poland
- Nazi crimes against the Polish nation
- Project Riese
- Die Glocke (conspiracy theory)
