= Kargów =

- Village
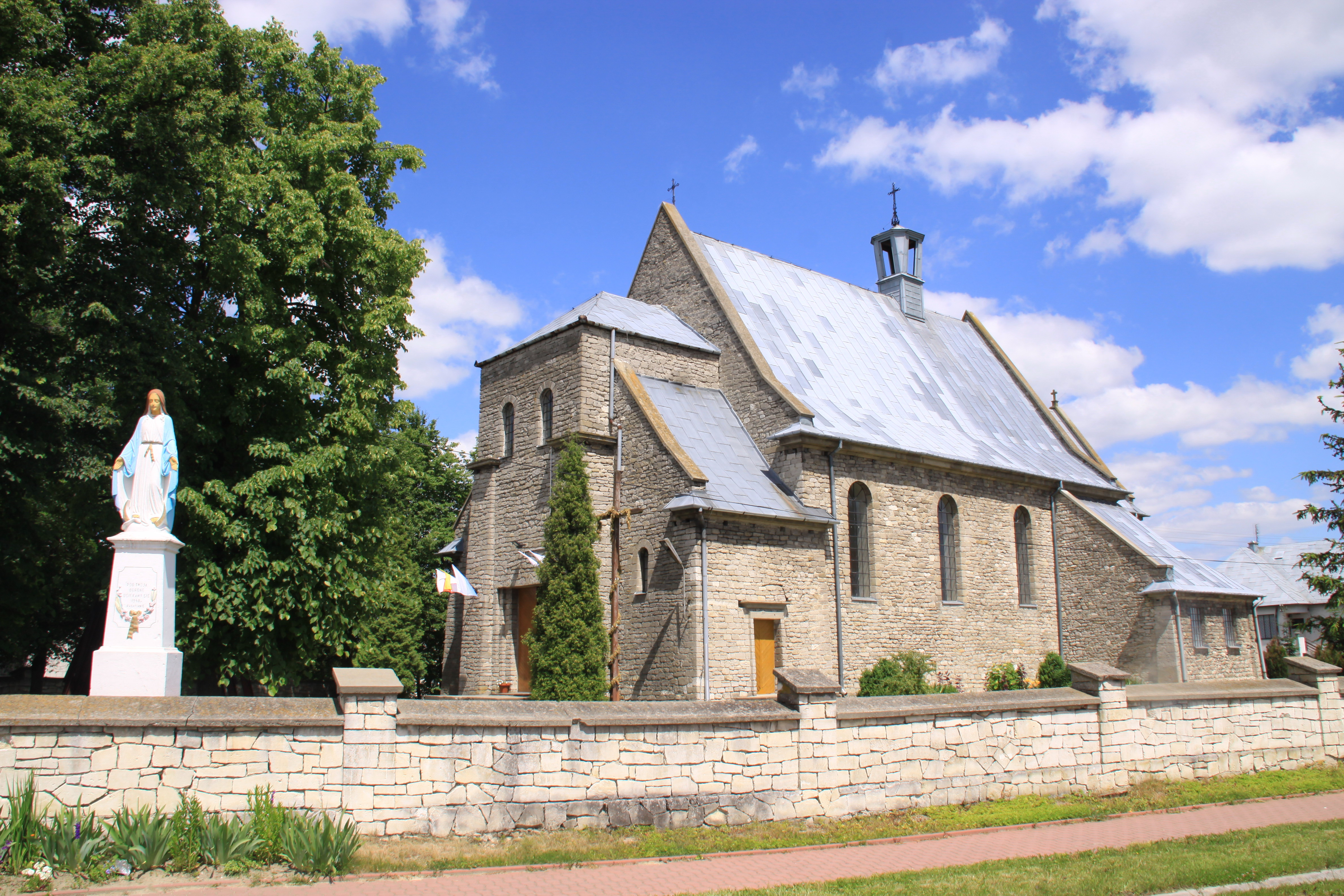
- Catholic church

- Location within Poland
- Coordinates: 50°31′N 20°55′E
- Country: Poland
- Voivodeship: Świętokrzyskie
- County: Busko
- Gmina: Tuczępy

Kargów [ˈkarɡuf] is a village in the administrative district of Gmina Tuczępy, within Busko County, Świętokrzyskie Voivodeship, in south-central Poland. It lies approximately 6 km (4 mi) west of Tuczępy, 16 km (10 mi) east of Busko-Zdrój, and 46 km (29 mi) south-east of the regional capital Kielce.
