= Dobrów =

Dobrów may refer to the following places:

- Dobrów, Greater Poland Voivodeship (central Poland)
- Dobrów, Masovian Voivodeship (central Poland)
- Dobrów, Świętokrzyskie Voivodeship (south-central Poland)
