= Chałupki =

Chałupki (meaning "cottages") may refer to several localities in Poland:

- Chałupki, Lower Silesian Voivodeship (south-west Poland)
- Chałupki, Radomsko County in Łódź Voivodeship (central Poland)
- Chałupki, Sieradz County in Łódź Voivodeship (central Poland)
- Chałupki, Busko County in Świętokrzyskie Voivodeship (south-central Poland)
- Chałupki, Kielce County in Świętokrzyskie Voivodeship (south-central Poland)
- Chałupki, Nisko County in Subcarpathian Voivodeship (south-east Poland)
- Chałupki, Przeworsk County in Subcarpathian Voivodeship (south-east Poland)
- Chałupki, Racibórz County in Silesian Voivodeship (south Poland)
- Chałupki, Włoszczowa County in Świętokrzyskie Voivodeship (south-central Poland)
- Chałupki, Zawiercie County in Silesian Voivodeship (south Poland)

== See also ==
- Chałupki Chotynieckie
- Chałupki Dębniańskie
- Chałupki Dusowskie
