= Brzozówka, Świętokrzyskie Voivodeship =

Brzozówka
- Village
- Location within Poland
- Coordinates: 50°31′50″N 20°55′21″E
- Country: Poland
- Voivodeship: Świętokrzyskie
- County: Busko
- Gmina: Tuczępy
- Population: 90

Brzozówka [bʐɔˈzufka] is a village in the administrative district of Gmina Tuczępy, within Busko County, Świętokrzyskie Voivodeship, in south-central Poland. It lies approximately 6 km (4 mi) west of Tuczępy, 17 km (11 mi) north-east of Busko-Zdrój, and 45 km (28 mi) south-east of the regional capital Kielce.
