= Sieczków, Świętokrzyskie Voivodeship =

Sieczków
- Village
- Location within Poland
- Coordinates: 50°31′20″N 20°58′37″E
- Country: Poland
- Voivodeship: Świętokrzyskie
- County: Busko
- Gmina: Tuczępy

Sieczków [ˈɕɛt͡ʂkuf] is a village in the administrative district of Gmina Tuczępy, within Busko County, Świętokrzyskie Voivodeship, in south-central Poland. It lies approximately 2 km (1 mi) north-west of Tuczępy, 20 km (12 mi) east of Busko-Zdrój, and 48 km (30 mi) south-east of the regional capital Kielce.
