= Sachalin, Świętokrzyskie Voivodeship =

Sachalin
- Village
- Location within Poland
- Coordinates: 50°32′49″N 20°59′40″E
- Country: Poland
- Voivodeship: Świętokrzyskie
- County: Busko
- Gmina: Tuczępy

Sachalin [saˈxalin] is a village in the administrative district of Gmina Tuczępy, within Busko County, Świętokrzyskie Voivodeship, in south-central Poland. It lies approximately 4 km (2 mi) north of Tuczępy, 22 km (14 mi) north-east of Busko-Zdrój, and 46 km (29 mi) south-east of the regional capital Kielce.
