= Johannes Hassebroek =

SS officer (1910–1977)

Johannes Hassebroek (11 July 1910, in Halle, Saxony-Anhalt – 17 April 1977, in Westerstede) was a German SS commander during the Nazi era. He served as a commandant of the Gross-Rosen concentration camp and its sub-camps from October 1943 until the end of the war. Hassebroek was tried for his crimes by the British occupational authorities, convicted to life imprisonment, and released in 1954. The later prosecution by the West German authorities proved unsuccessful.

== Early years ==
Hassebroek was born in Halle, and was the son of a prison guard who had joined Der Stahlhelm after his service in the First World War. He encouraged his son to become involved in right-wing politics, and enrolled him in the conservative Bismarckbund youth movement. The young Hassebroek also attempted to enlist in the army but was rejected, due largely to the reduction in size ordered by the terms of the Treaty of Versailles, and as such he was apprenticed to a factory instead.

Hassebroek initially continued as a member of the Bismarckbund before switching to the Sturmabteilung as a 19-year-old, joining the Nazi Party the following year (#256,527). He lost his job in 1931 and spent three years unemployed, during which time his faith in Nazism was strengthened. During this time, he was a regular in the SA street fights against Communist Party supporters whilst also serving as a volunteer counsellor with the Hitler Youth. The party found him a job with the Saxon Fishermen's Association in 1934, although this ended when their offices moved to Berlin, leaving Hassebroek unemployed again.

== SS career ==
In June 1934, he left the SA to join the SS (#107,426) instead, under the advice of a friend who told him that SS membership would help him get into the police. He was put to work in an administrative role with little hope of promotion after SS psychologists deemed him too compliable and weak-willed for officer material. However, he appealed the decision, and was allowed to enter the officer training scheme at Braunschweig. Initially he failed, but, following another appeal, was given a second chance, and at 26 passed the course and was given a trial run as an SS officer.

Hassebroek's first assignment was as a member of the SS-Death's Head Units stationed at the concentration camp at Esterwegen. Reports from his superiors at the time still criticised his lack of a forceful personality, although they also indicated an improvement. When Esterwegen was closed in 1936, he was transferred to a unit near Sachsenhausen concentration camp before being sent for Wehrmacht training, and was sent to the front when the Second World War broke out. However, he remained an SS man, being attached to Theodor Eicke's 3rd SS Division Totenkopf rather than the regular army. Hassebroek's reports improved significantly whilst he was at war, and in 1942, he was promoted to Hauptsturmführer, his first promotion.

== Concentration camp commandant ==
Hassebroek fell ill in the summer of 1942 before suffering a right leg wound, resulting in long spells in military hospitals in Riga, Munich and Berlin. Whilst at the latter facility, he met Richard Glücks, who had overall charge of the concentration camps, and he soon requested that Hassebroek be sent to his units.

Returning to Sachsenhausen in August 1942, he remained there until October 1943, when he was given command of Gross-Rosen concentration camp in succession to Wilhelm Gideon. The camp that Hassebroek took over had only 3000 inmates, but it grew rapidly in size under his command, and by the time it was closed, had as many as 80,000.

By late 1944, Hassebroek, who had been promoted to Major (Sturmbannführer) in the interim, also had responsibility for thirteen sub-camps set up to deal with the severe overcrowding in Gross-Rosen. It was estimated that as many as 100,000 people had died at the camp under Hassebroek's command. For his part, Hassebroek was adjudged a success in his new role, with Glücks reporting that he "exudes self-confidence and toughness" near the end of the war.

== Criminal investigations ==
Hassebroek was initially arrested by Czechoslovaks before ultimately passing into the hands of the British Army who put him on trial. He was sentenced to death, but this was quickly commuted to life imprisonment and finally to fifteen years. He was released from prison in 1954.

He settled in Braunschweig, where he worked as a sales agent until 1967, when he was arrested under German law for his involvement in the camps. He was accused of being personally responsible for the killings of nine Jews and three other inmates at Gross-Rosen, in part because of evidence arising from the testimonies given by Oskar Schindler earlier in the decade. In the case that followed, he was acquitted by the Braunschweig court and then again, following an appeal by the prosecution, by the Federal Constitutional Court of Germany. He was under investigation until his death in 1977.

Up to his death in 1977, Hassebroek remained nostalgic for his SS days, commenting to Israeli historian Tom Segev that "our service was an overwhelming emotional experience of enormous strength. We believed not only in the same values and ideals - we believed in each other". He also claimed that he had no involvement in killings, arguing "all I know about the atrocities at Gross Rosen I learnt during the trials against me."
