= Boris Braun =

Croatian professor and Holocaust survivor (1920–2018)

- Born: 20 August 1920; Đurđevac, Kingdom of Serbs, Croats and Slovenes (now Croatia)
- Died: 7 October 2018 (aged 98)
- Education: University of Zagreb
- Occupation: University professor

Boris Braun (20 August 1920 – 7 October 2018) was a Croatian University professor, Holocaust survivor, and member of the Jewish community in Zagreb.

== Early life ==
Braun was born to Šandor and Elizabeta (née Mautner) Braun, members of a notable and wealthy Jewish family of Đurđevac. He had a sister called Štefica. The Braun family were reputable and respected in Đurđevac, where they owned the sawmill, vineyard, mill and ice factory. His father brought electricity to the Đurđevac region and maintained the local substation. Braun's father was a close friend of Ivan Šubašić and Mate Starčević, mayor of Zagreb, both of whom participated in the hunting events organized every year at the Braun estate.

Before World War II he studied agriculture at the University of Zagreb. In 1941, with the establishment of the Independent State of Croatia, Braun was banned from the University of Zagreb for being Jewish. He returned to Đurđevac where he helped his father run the family business. Braun also helped maintain the substation and learned from his father's employees about electricity, knowledge that would later save his life. In the autumn of 1942, although his father was an acquaintance of the Independent State of Croatia military commander Slavko Kvaternik, Braun and his parents were arrested and transported to Zagreb, to the prison at Savska Cesta. Only Braun's sister managed to avoid the arrest because she was married to a Catholic from Zagreb. Eight months later in 1943, with a large group of Jews from Zagreb, Braun and his parents were deported in the cattle wagons to Auschwitz.

== Life in the camps ==
His parents were killed in the gas chambers upon arrival, but Braun saved himself when he lied that he was an electrician. In Auschwitz, with others, Braun repaired and maintained the gas chambers. Some time later Braun volunteered to be transferred to the Central Labour Camp Jaworzno, as the Nazis looked for volunteers to establish the new camp. At Jaworzno, Braun maintained the SS and prisoner barracks. On 17 January 1945 Braun was marched away westward with other prisoners. Hundreds died on the way to the Gross-Rosen concentration camp in Lower Silesia, including about 300 shot dead in a massacre which occurred on the second night of this death march. From Gross-Rosen concentration camp, Braun was transported to Buchenwald concentration camp. There he welcomed liberation and the end of World War II.

== Post War ==
In the summer of 1945, Braun returned to the University of Zagreb, where he finished his studies at the Faculty of Agriculture. He worked as a professor at the university until 1971. That year he rebelled against the decision of the other university professors to expel a colleague who had participated in the Croatian Spring. Later he worked as a poultry inspector. Braun was very active in bearing witness to the horrors of Holocaust to elementary and primary school children across Zagreb.

In 2005, Braun was named an Honorary Citizen of Đurđevac. He died on 7 October 2018 at the age of 98 years.

== Bibliography ==
- Goldstein, Ivo (2001). Holokaust u Zagrebu. Zagreb: Novi Liber. ISBN 953-6045-19-2.
