= Chałupki, Busko County =

Chałupki
- Village
- Location within Poland
- Coordinates: 50°31′42″N 20°56′52″E
- Country: Poland
- Voivodeship: Świętokrzyskie
- County: Busko
- Gmina: Tuczępy
- Population: 230

Chałupki [xaˈwupki] is a village in the administrative district of Gmina Tuczępy, within Busko County, Świętokrzyskie Voivodeship, in south-central Poland. It lies approximately 4 km (2 mi) west of Tuczępy, 18 km (11 mi) north-east of Busko-Zdrój, and 46 km (29 mi) south-east of the regional capital Kielce.
