= Grzymała, Świętokrzyskie Voivodeship =

Grzymała
- Village
- Location within Poland
- Coordinates: 50°31′59″N 20°58′22″E
- Country: Poland
- Voivodeship: Świętokrzyskie
- County: Busko
- Gmina: Tuczępy
- Population: 230

Grzymała [ɡʐɨˈmawa] is a village in the administrative district of Gmina Tuczępy, within Busko County, Świętokrzyskie Voivodeship, in south-central Poland. It lies approximately 3 km (2 mi) north-west of Tuczępy, 20 km (12 mi) east of Busko-Zdrój, and 47 km (29 mi) south-east of the regional capital Kielce.
