= Januszkowice, Świętokrzyskie Voivodeship =

Januszkowice
- Village
- Location within Poland
- Coordinates: 50°30′44″N 21°2′50″E
- Country: Poland
- Voivodeship: Świętokrzyskie
- County: Busko
- Gmina: Tuczępy
- Population: 150

Januszkowice [januʂkɔˈvit͡sɛ] is a village in the administrative district of Gmina Tuczępy, within Busko County, Świętokrzyskie Voivodeship, in south-central Poland. It lies approximately 4 km (2 mi) east of Tuczępy, 24 km (15 mi) east of Busko-Zdrój, and 52 km (32 mi) south-east of the regional capital Kielce.
