= Dobrów, Świętokrzyskie Voivodeship =

Dobrów
- Village
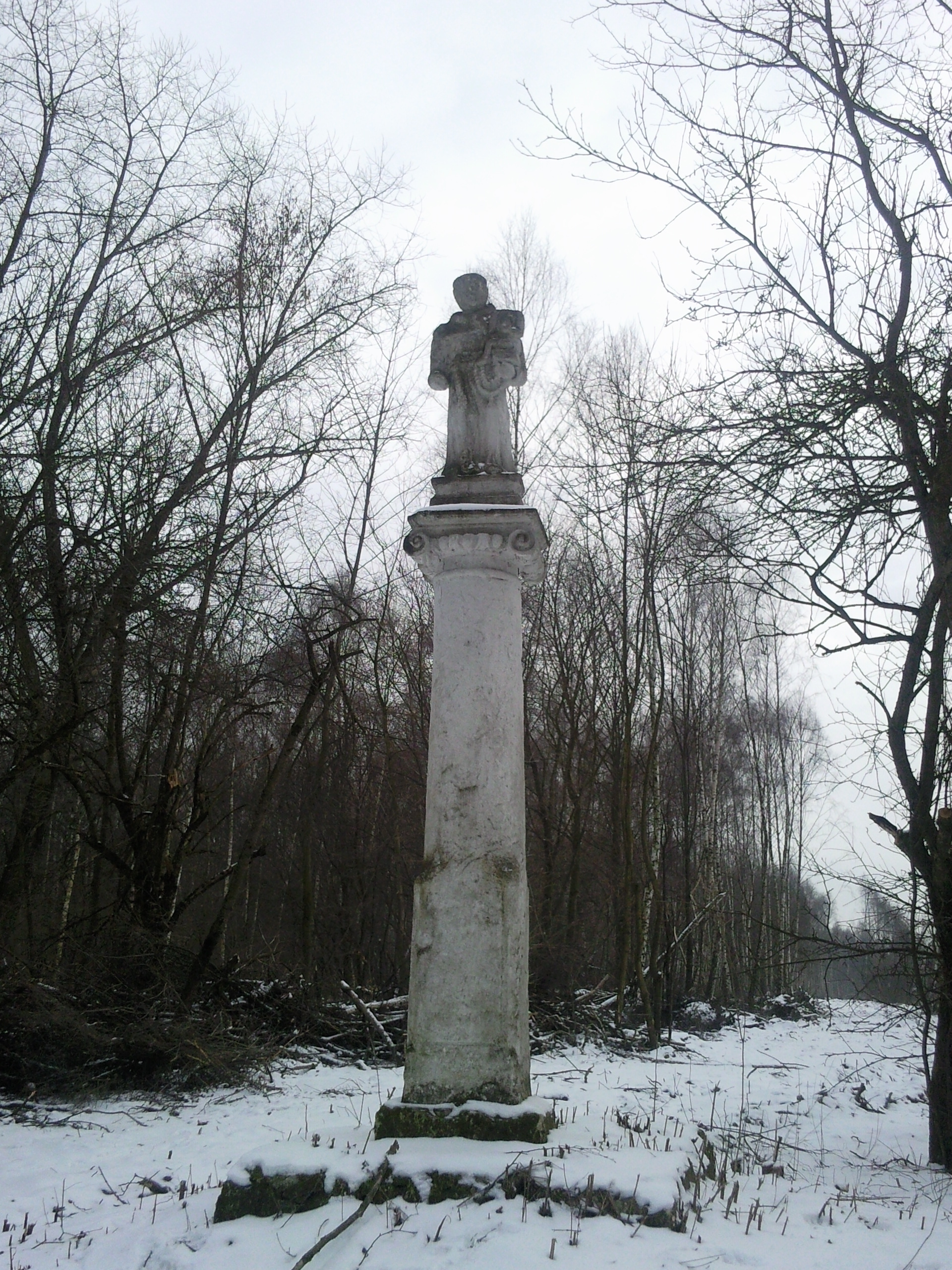

- Location within Poland
- Coordinates: 50°32′16″N 21°2′43″E
- Country: Poland
- Voivodeship: Świętokrzyskie
- County: Busko
- Gmina: Tuczępy
- Population: 20

Dobrów [ˈdɔbruf] is a village in the administrative district of Gmina Tuczępy, within Busko County, Świętokrzyskie Voivodeship, in south-central Poland. It lies approximately 5 km (3 mi) north-east of Tuczępy, 25 km (16 mi) east of Busko-Zdrój, and 49 km (30 mi) south-east of the regional capital Kielce.
