= Paul Johannes Schlesinger =

Austrian unionist and politician (1874–1945)

Paul Johannes Schlesinger (July 9, 1874 – February 12, 1945) was an Austrian trade unionist and politician. He was a member of the Austrian Parliament from 1926 to 1934, then persecuted by the Ständestaat and thereafter by the Nazi Reich. He was killed by the Nazis at the Gross-Rosen concentration camp three months before the war ended.

== Biographical details ==
Schlesinger was born in Vienna where he also grew up and attended school. He learned the craft of precision mechanics in Vienna, Lundenburg and in St. Pölten. He then travelled all over Europe as a wandering journeyman, working in Hungary, Germany, in the Netherlands, in Belgium and Switzerland. In 1905, he returned to his hometown; shortly thereafter he was elected secretary of the Austrian Association of Metal Workers. He joined the Social Democratic Party of Austria (SdA) and in 1907 became chairman of the Regional Health Insurance in Baden bei Wien. In 1911 and in 1912 he served as a trade union representative for three districts in Lower Austria, for Mödling, Baden and Wiener Neustadt.

In 1921, Schlesinger became a member of the regional parliament of Lower Austria where he served for five years. In 1926, he was elected to the Austrian Parliament where he served until 1934 (apart from two months in 1930). After the authoritarian rule of Austrofascism was installed in Austria, Schlesinger was arrested and incarcerated for several months at the Anhaltelager Wöllersdorf. After the Anschluss, the annexation of Austria by Nazi Germany in March 1938, Schlesinger was arrested again, this time by the Gestapo, and held captive until 1939. On September 1, 1944, he was arrested again. The Nazis still feared the already seventy-year-old unionist and socialist. On September 19, 1944, he was deported to Concentration camp Auschwitz. As the Soviet troops approached Auschwitz, he was transferred to Groß-Rosen concentration camp, where he was murdered on February 12, 1945.

== Memorials ==
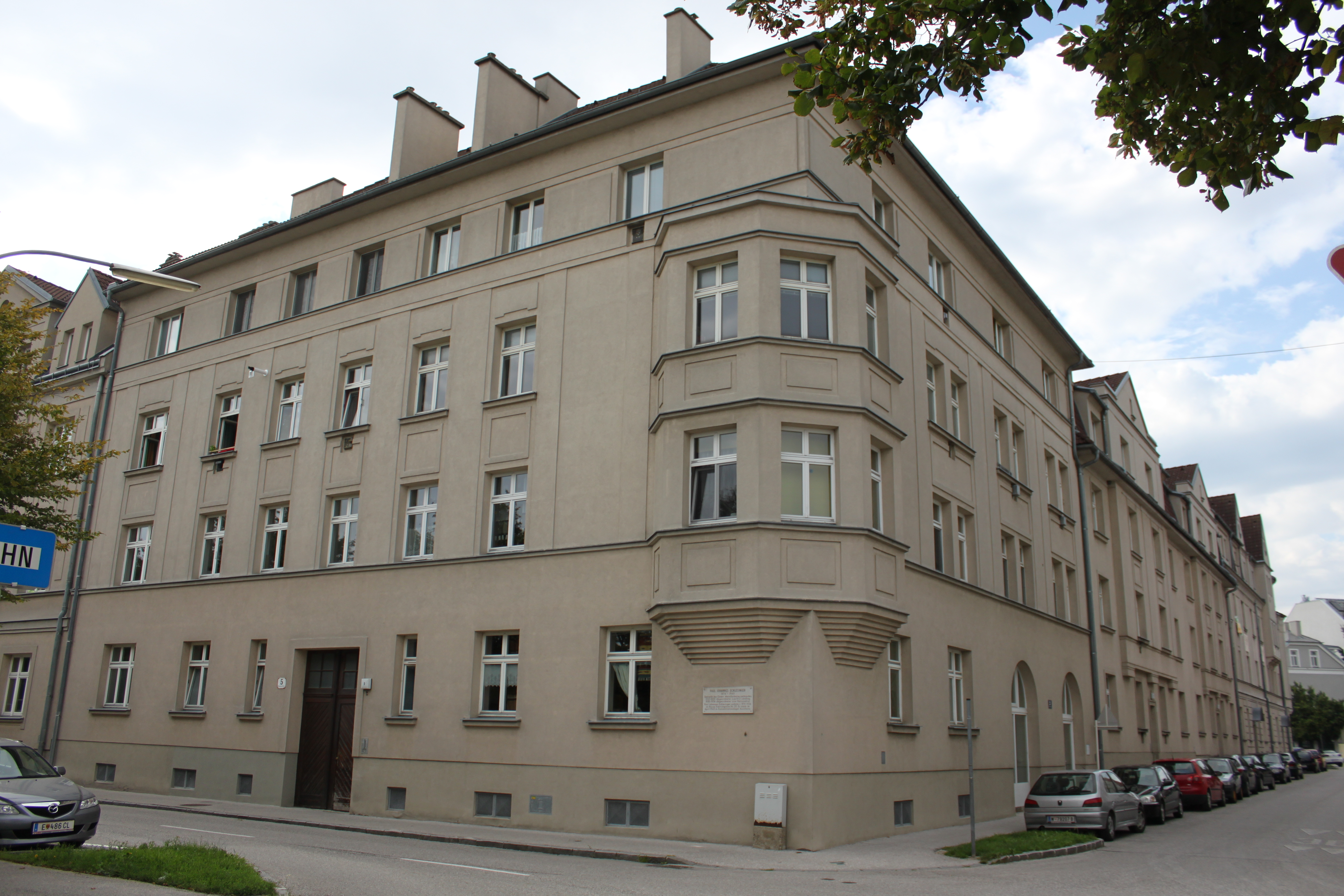
Residential building in Wiener Neustadt named after Schlesinger

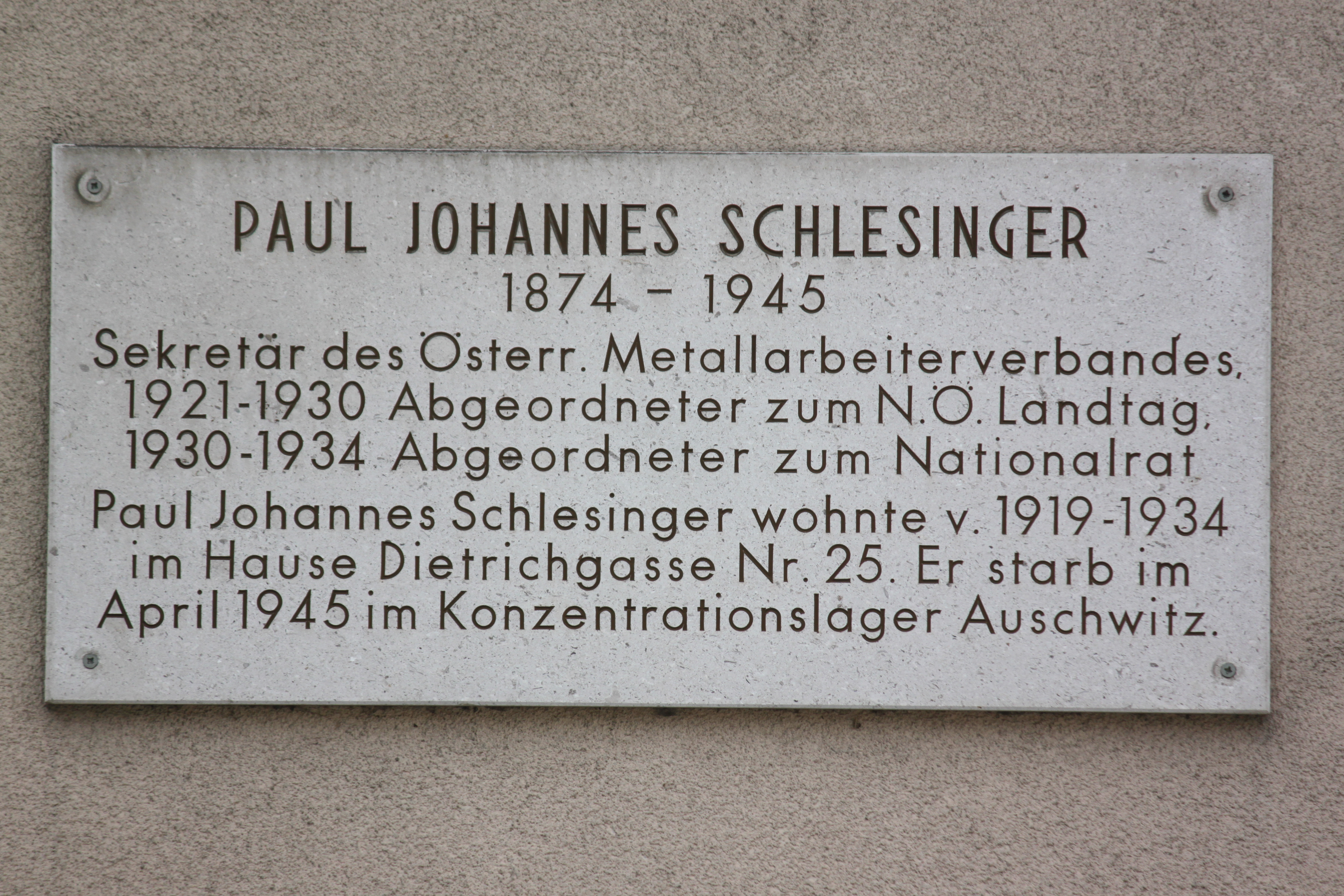
Memorial plaque on the building

In 1988, the Austrian Parliament honored all twelve former Members of Parliament who lost their lives in their fight against the Nazi Reich. One of them was Paul Johannes Schlesinger. The plaque is placed on the right side of the main entrance of the building.

Also, a residential building in Wiener Neustadt was named after Schlesinger. A memorial plaque for Schlesinger can be seen on the building to this day. Since 2010, a Stolperstein in front of the building Herzog Leopold-Strasse 28 (also in Wiener Neustadt) commemorates his deportation and death.
