= Gabersdorf labour camp =

Forced labour camp and Nazi concentration camp in Libeč, Czechoslovakia

Coordinates: 50°35′46″N 15°56′46″E

The Gabersdorf forced labour camp (also known as Wolta or Wolta-Gabersdorf), later a Nazi concentration camp, was located at Libeč (today part of Trutnov) in Czechoslovakia.

In the camp, Jewish women were detained who worked at the textile factories of Hasse and company, Etrich, and Vereinigte Textilwerke K. H. Barthel. The camp was established in 1941 and became a subcamp of Gross-Rosen on 22 March 1944. According to a survivor, there were about 70 women in one barracks. The typical camp meal was a soup of water and rutabaga. Daily rations declined in quality and quantity over time; as the war progressed, the prisoners' daily portion of bread was decreased to 220 grams. The camp was liberated by the Russian army on 6 May 1945.
