= Gmina Tuczępy =

Gmina Tuczępy Tuczępy Commune
- Gmina
- Flag Coat of arms
- Interactive map of Gmina Tuczępy
- Coordinates (Tuczępy): 50°31′0″N 20°59′34″E
- Country: Poland
- Voivodeship: Świętokrzyskie
- County: Busko
- Seat: Tuczępy

Area
  - Total: 83.74 km^{2} (32.33 sq mi)

Population (2006)
  - Total: 3,900
  - Density: 47/km^{2} (120/sq mi)
- Website: http://www.tuczepy.pl

Gmina Tuczępy is a rural gmina (administrative district) in Busko County, Świętokrzyskie Voivodeship, in south-central Poland. Its seat is the village of Tuczępy, which lies approximately 21 kilometres (13 mi) east of Busko-Zdrój and 49 km (30 mi) south-east of the regional capital Kielce.

The gmina covers an area of 83.74 square kilometres (32.3 sq mi), and as of 2006 its total population is 3,900.

== Villages ==
Gmina Tuczępy contains the villages and settlements of Brzozówka, Chałupki, Dobrów, Góra, Grzymała, Januszkowice, Jarosławice, Kargów, Nieciesławice, Niziny, Podlesie, Rzędów, Sachalin, Sieczków, Tuczępy and Wierzbica.

== Neighbouring gminas ==
Gmina Tuczępy is bordered by the gminas of Gnojno, Oleśnica, Rytwiany, Staszów, Stopnica and Szydłów.
