= Niziny, Busko County =

Niziny
- Village
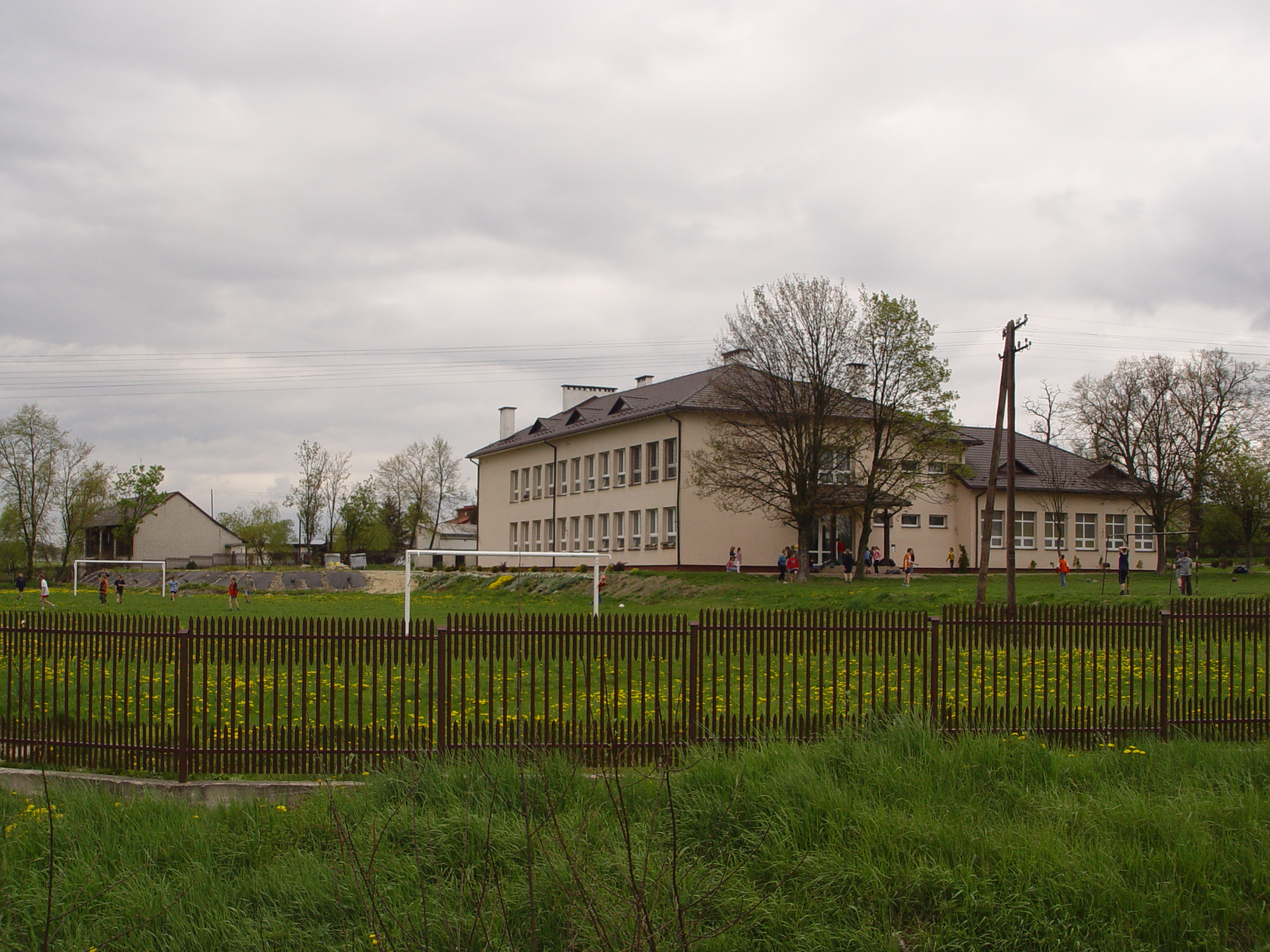

- Location within Poland
- Coordinates: 50°30′11″N 21°4′11″E
- Country: Poland
- Voivodeship: Świętokrzyskie
- County: Busko
- Gmina: Tuczępy

Niziny [niˈʑinɨ] is a village in the administrative district of Gmina Tuczępy, within Busko County, Świętokrzyskie Voivodeship, in south-central Poland. It lies approximately 6 km (4 mi) east of Tuczępy, 26 km (16 mi) east of Busko-Zdrój, and 53 km (33 mi) south-east of the regional capital Kielce.
