= Grzymała (surname) =

Grzymała or Grzymala is a Polish surname. Notable people with the surname include:

- Adam Grzymała-Siedlecki (1876–1967), Polish writer
- Andrzej Grzymała (died 1466), Polish academic
- Anna Grzymala (born 1970), American political scientist
- Domarat Grzymała (died 1324), Polish bishop
- Edward Grzymała (1906–1942), Polish Roman Catholic priest
- Wojciech Grzymała (1793–1871), Polish soldier and politician
