= Georg Güßregen =

Nazi officer

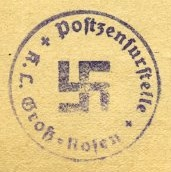
Gross Rosen Seal

Georg Güßregen (Georg Güssregen) (born July 4, 1890) was an SS Obersturmführer. He joined the Nazi Party on September 10, 1939. His SS Membership number was 222498. He had one party number: 3988326.

== Service history ==
Promoted to Oberscharführer October 1, 1939

Promoted to Hauptscharführer January 2, 1941

Promoted to Untersturmführer April 20, 1941

Promoted to Obersturmführer November 9, 1944
