= Tuczępy, Świętokrzyskie Voivodeship =

Tuczępy
- Village
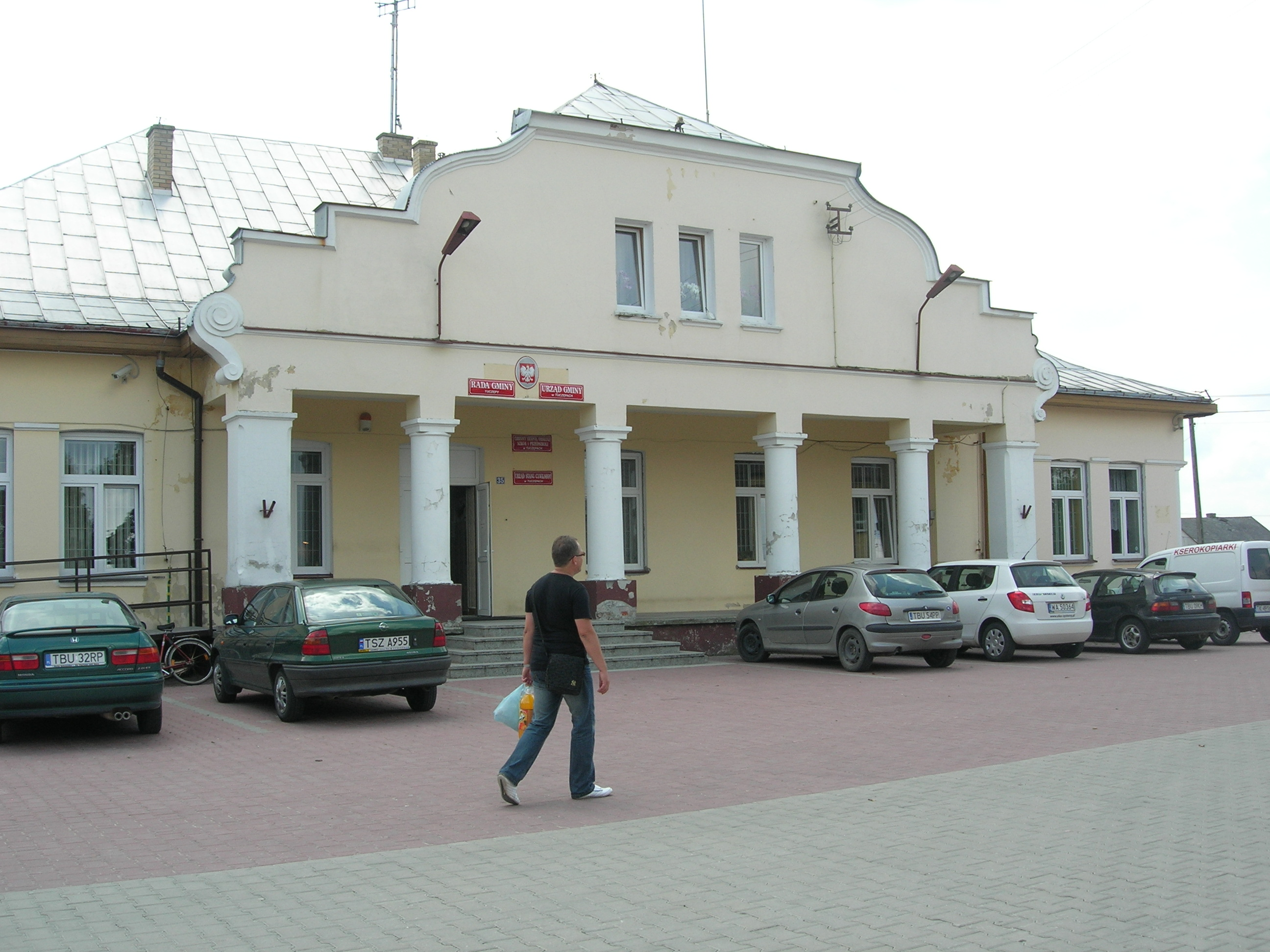
- Gmina office

- Coat of arms

- Location within Poland
- Coordinates: 50°31′0″N 20°59′34″E
- Country: Poland
- Voivodeship: Świętokrzyskie
- County: Busko
- Gmina: Tuczępy

Tuczępy [tuˈt͡ʂɛmpɨ] is a village in Busko County, Świętokrzyskie Voivodeship, in south-central Poland. It is the seat of the gmina (administrative district) called Gmina Tuczępy. It lies approximately 21 km (13 mi) east of Busko-Zdrój and 49 km (30 mi) south-east of the regional capital Kielce.
