= Jean Vesque de Puttelange =

Jean Vesque de Puttelange (12 November 1760 – 1 March 1829), born in Brussels, was a government official of the Holy Roman Empire, serving in administrations in the Habsburg Netherlands and Vienna. He belonged to a family originally from Lorraine, the Vesques de Puttelange (a town on the French border with Luxembourg). He was the father of the diplomat Johann Vesque von Püttlingen, who composed operas and songs under the pseudonym 'J. van Hoven'.

== Life ==
He was born in Brussels, Austrian Netherlands, where his father - also named Jean Vesque - was Inspector-General of the estates of the Bishop of Metz, and from 1760 Inspector of Imperial Lotteries, a post in the government of the Austrian Netherlands. His French mother, Cécilie de Roquilly, came from Commercy in the department of Meuse. He went to school in his mother's home town of Commercy, and then attended the faculties of philosophy and law at University of Louvain. In 1787, he was given a post in the government service in Brussels where he was on the commission charged with reform of ecclesiastical affairs.

On the outbreak of the Brabant Revolution in October 1789 (which occurred simultaneously with the French Revolution and the Liège Revolution, the whole Austrian administration sought safety in Luxembourg; because of a lack of horses, Vesque couldn't go, and stayed in fr:Treurenberg in Brussels for two months. Brabant formed the nucleus of the unrecognised United Belgian States. Vesque eventually arrived in Trier, where the rest of the government in exile had gathered along with Philipp von Cobenzl.

An Austrian army defeated the Belgian revolutionaries in December 1790; in the Revolution's aftermath a convention was held at The Hague on 10 December 1790 to decide how to re-establish Austrian rule, at which Vesque was a negotiator. The Liège Revolution was also finally suppressed by Austrian forces in January 1791. His novel Le Roi Guiot was published in 1791. On 17 March 1793 Archduke Charles, Duke of Teschen became Governor of the Habsburg Netherlands and Vesque returned to Brussels where - among other functions, he acted as censor of theatres.

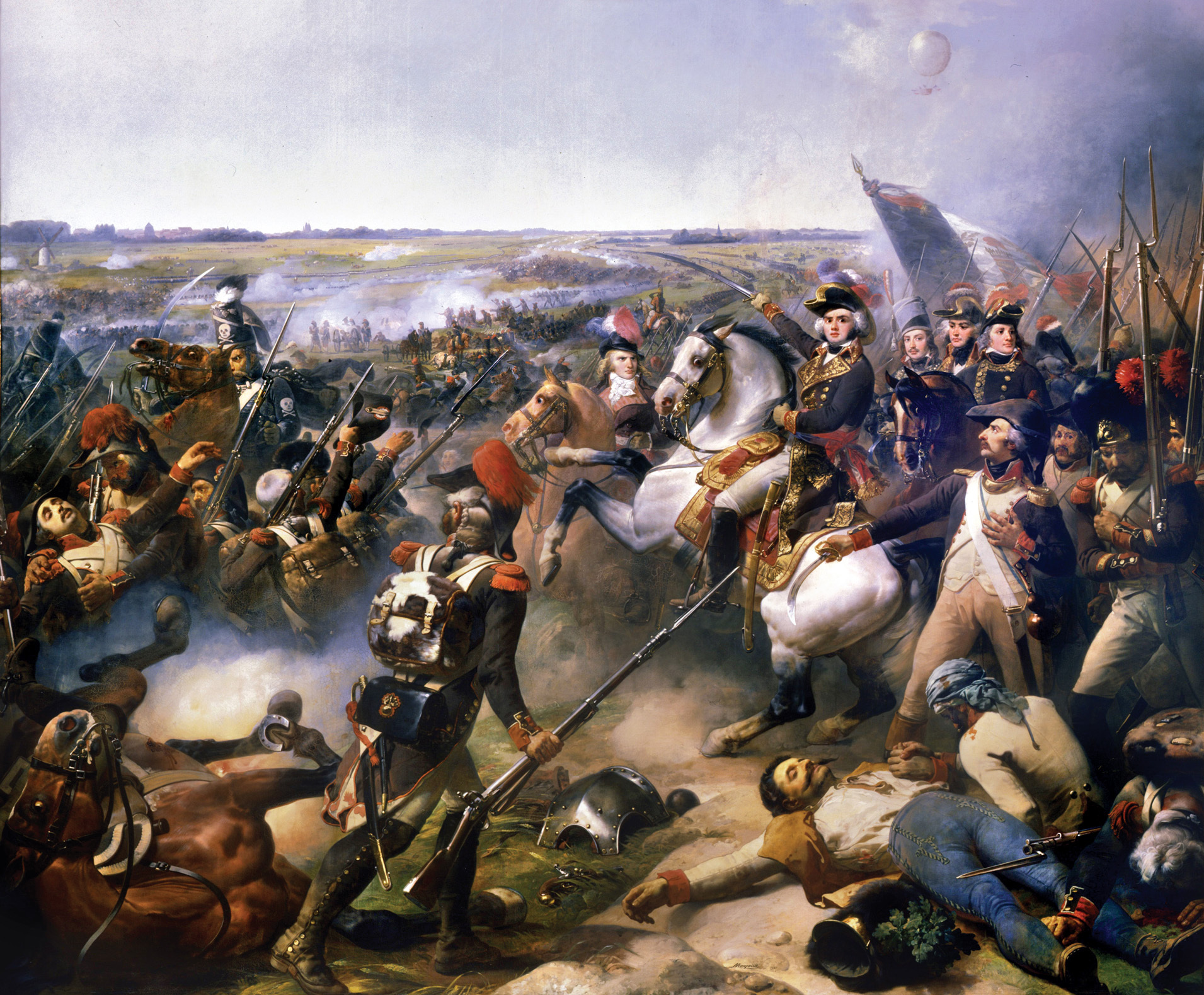
The Battle of Fleurus, with French observation balloon at top right

The peace only lasted a few months before the outbreak of the War of the First Coalition, which was an attempt by the Triple Alliance (Prussia, Austria and Britain) to defeat Revolutionary France. France invaded the Low Countries in 1794. The Austrian administration fled for the second time, and during the evacuation of Brussels Vesque was in charge of the government archives, taking them down the River Rhine through Holland to Düsseldorf; thence he went to Aachen (Aix-la-Chapelle), and continued to Dillenburg in the Duchy of Nassau, where his time of service (since 1787) with the Austrian administration came to an end on 31 December 1794. It appears that he was relatively destitute; he had no belongings since everything was in Brussels. An Austrian Army was defeated in 1795 at the Battle of Fleurus; France formally annexed the Low Countries, and brought in a government in a typically new French style based on merit rather than parentage (the French period).

== Exiled émigré ==
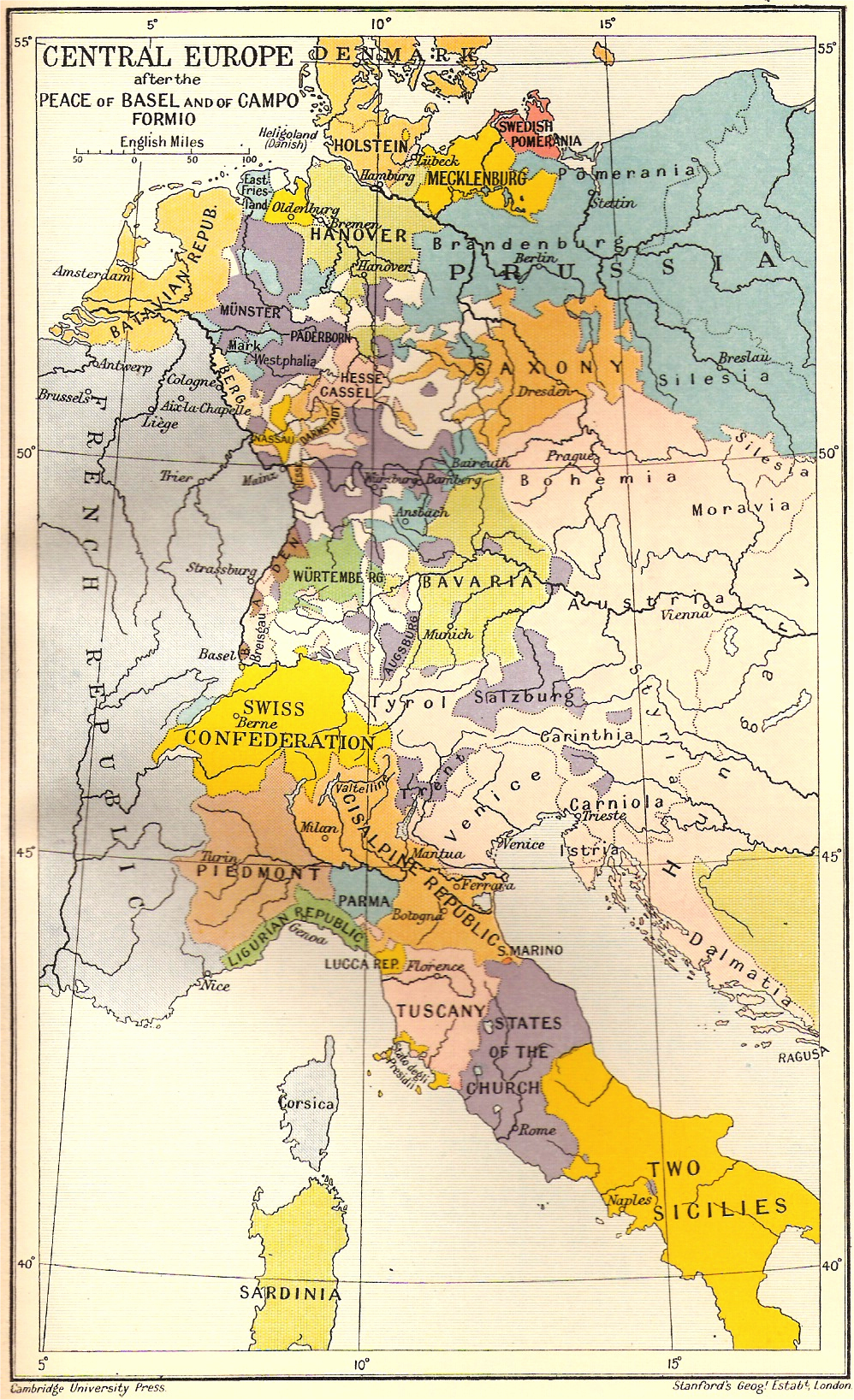
Peace of Basel & Campo Formio

With the Austrian government in Belgium dissolved, Vesque hoped to get to Vienna. However, an Imperial decree made it illegal for government officials from the former Austrian territories to stay or settle in Vienna; and he fell ill on the way and stayed for some time in Frankfurt. With no home to go to, and with dwindling finances, Vesque set off through Germany and Switzerland (mostly on foot), relying on a small pension; he stayed some time in Italy (perhaps including Milan) studying fine art treasures ('Kunstschätze').

At the end of 1799 he was in Lower Austria in Korneuburg, just outside Vienna, but he pleaded in vain to obtain permission to stay in the capital. He travelled on to Bohemia where his fiancée, Therese Leenher von Sleeuw, was staying in Prague with her dispossessed family; they were finally married in Prague in 1801. He travelled into Moravia, Schleswig, and finally to West Galicia, which had recently come under Habsburg control in 1795 in the Third Partition of Poland.

== Tutor to Polish nobility ==
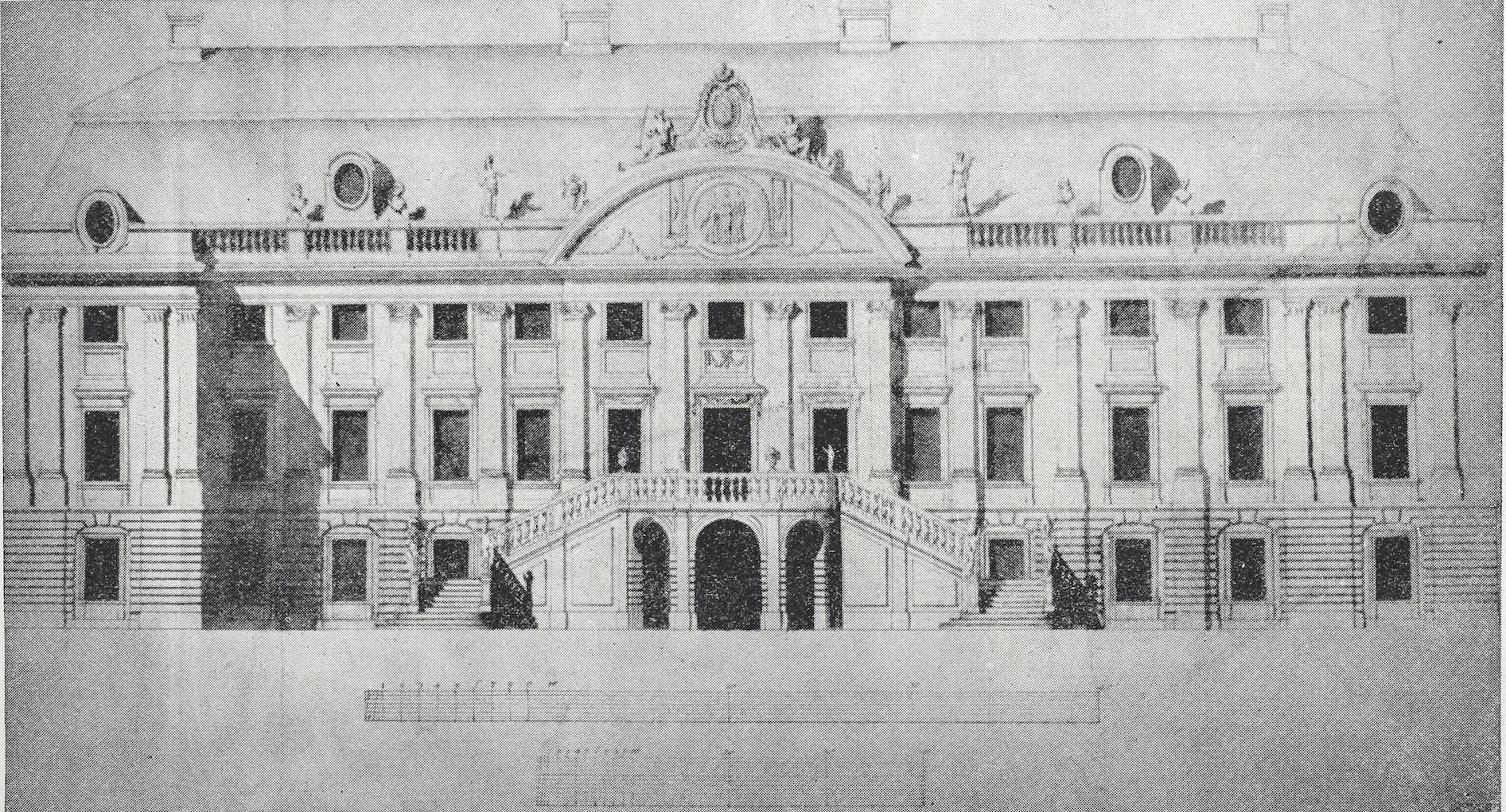
The Lubomirski Palace in Opole Lubelskie, designed c.1770 by i.a. Domenico Merlini

Around 1800/1801 Vesque was employed by Prince Alexander Lubomirski as tutor for his daughter Princess Rosalia Alexandra Lubomirska in Łańcut Castle, Łańcut, and then as librarian at the Lubomirski Palace in Opole Lubelskie, West Galicia (now Lublin Voivodship, Poland).

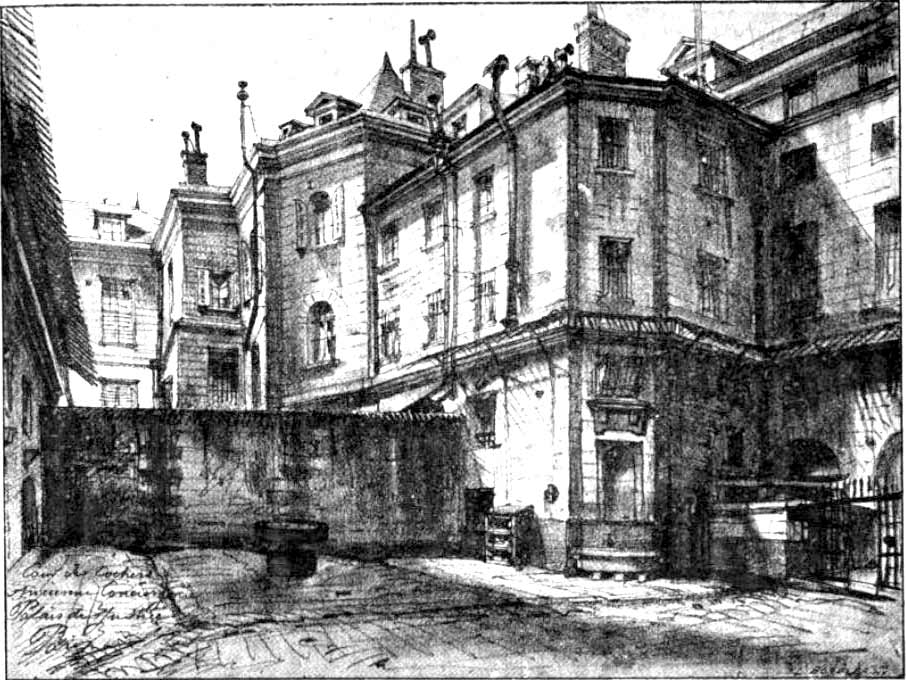
The women's quarter in the Conciergerie prisons, Paris, where the seven year-old princess Rosalia Alexandra Lubomirska was held in 1794.

Alexander's daughter, named Rozalia (Rosalie) like her mother (the adventurous Rozalia Lubomirska), had an interesting childhood. The seven year-old Rosalie had been incarcerated in Paris during the Reign of Terror with her mother, whose house was frequented by British spies and Girondist counter-revolutionaries. (Note: Rozalia Lubomirska had left her husband Prince Alexander for a lover in France, and came back to Poland during the republican-inspired Constitution of May 3, 1791. Alexander Lubomirski may have possibly invited the Russians in, as a member of the Targowica Confederation of conservative magnates; their aims were just to restore the previous status quo. However, the 'liberating' Russians never went away, instead instigating the Second Partition of Poland. The Kościuszko Uprising followed, in which Prince Adam Kazimierz Czartoryski was heavily involved with the republicans; his palace in Pulawy was burned by Russian troops after they quelled the uprising. During the Third Partition of Poland Russia, Prussia and Habsburg Austria permanently divided the country; it didn't resurface as a nation state until 1917.)

Her mother was arrested several times, held in the Conciergerie prisons, and guillotined in June 1794. The half-starved child was almost lost: her father Prince Alexander, who was in the French Army, heard of her plight, and sent someone to fetch her, who arrived only three days before she was to have been sent to the Foundling Hospital of Paris, the fr:Hôpital Saint-Vincent-de-Paul. She was released after the Thermidorian Reaction (27 July 1794) and the death of Maximilien Robespierre, and later returned to Poland with her father.

The War of the Second Coalition was still being waged, and after the Battle of Marengo and Battle of Hohenlinden - both defeats for Austria in 1800 - the Treaty of Lunéville was signed in February 1801, in which France expanded into the Southern Netherlands and Luxembourg. The French Republic called for a vote from the inhabitants of the former states if they wanted to become French citizens and remain in a Franco-Belgian state, or whether to be exiled as foreigners and be dispossessed. Vesque told the resident French Minister in Vienna, citoyen Champagny, that he wished to be Austrian as one of those « individus belges qui ont déclaré vouloir rester sujets autrichiens » ('Belgian individuals who have declared that they wished to remain Austrian'); he was considered an émigré and his estates and property in Lorraine, in the département des Forêts in Luxembourg, and in Belgium were sequestrated, although he still couldn't get a job in Vienna because on the ban on Austrian-Belgian officials/civil servants.

Vesque's firstborn son, Johann Vesque von Püttlingen was born in the Lubomirski Palace in 1803, and was held by Princess Rosalia at his baptism.

== Career in Vienna ==
When in 1804 the ban was lifted which had denied the Belgian officials from staying in Vienna, the Lubomirskis, father and daughter, and Vesque moved there straight away. Rosalie Lubomirski married Count Wacław Seweryn Rzewuski in Vienna that year, and Vesque soon received a court appointment as Royal Secretary ('K.K. Hofsecretär'), and Kanzleidirector of the Oberstkämmereramtes. In the job he acquired the full confidence of Oberstkämmerer Director Count Rudolf Wrbna. Vesque's house at that time formed a rallying point of emigrant Belgians staying in Vienna.

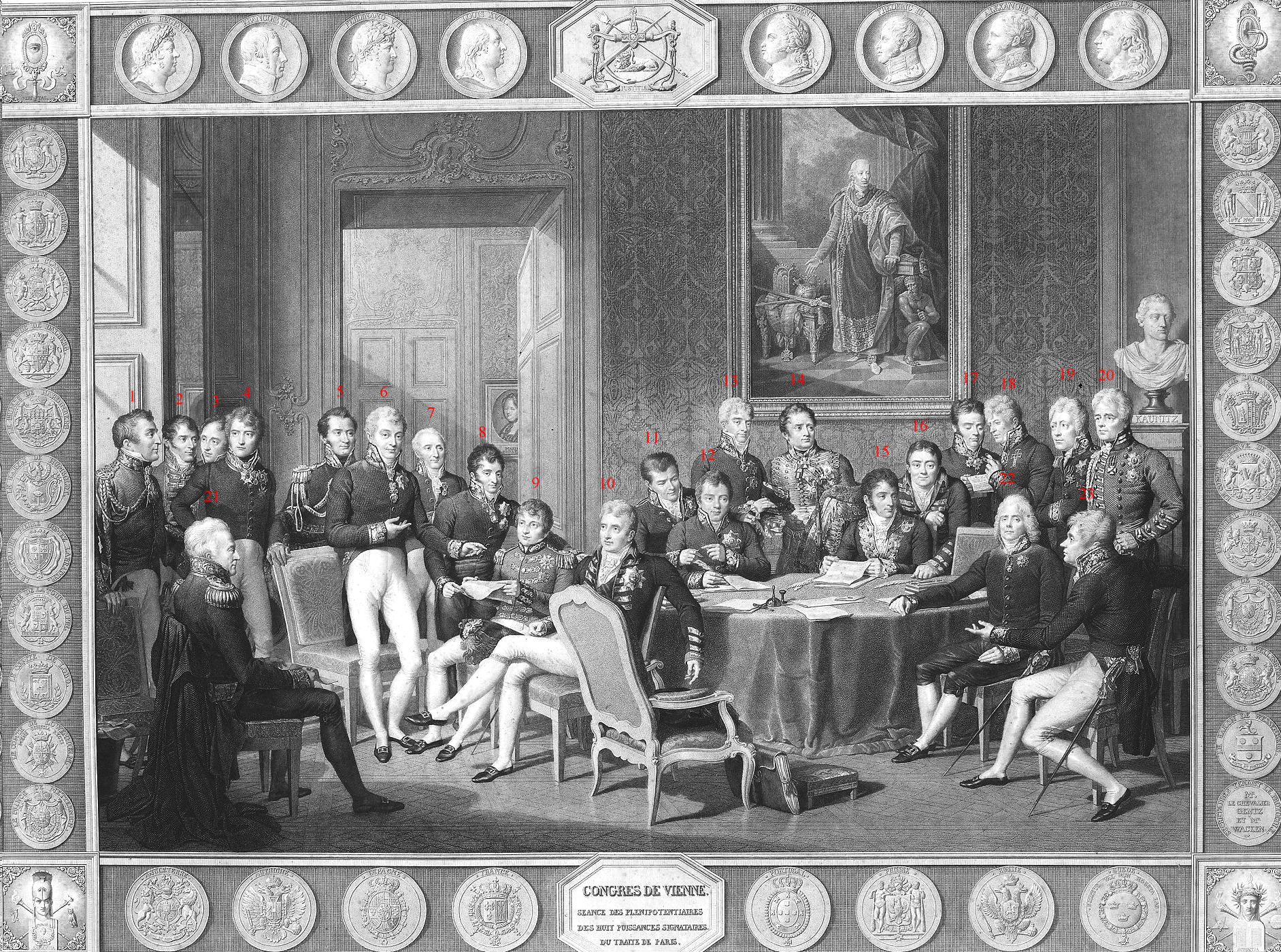
Delegates at the Congress of Vienna, 1815

After the French victory over Austria, he was charged with the negotiations with the conquerors. From 1814 to 1816, he was attached to the personnel of Archduke Charles during his travels to Paris, Milan and Venice.(French) Charles was governor of Fortress Mainz in 1815.

In his capacity as Imperial Treasurer, Vesque appears in the painting of the coronation in 1816 of the Empress Charlotte-Augusta, the third wife of the Emperor Francis II. He was a State Councillor from 1818. After the death of Rudolph Wrbna there was a reduction in status for the director of the Oberstkämmer; Vesque got a position in March 1824 in the Royal Library (Hofbibliotek): he was successively Chief Archivist of the Imperial Library, and archivist of the artistic and natural collections in the Crown palaces, the position he held until his death in 1829.

He had an equally erudite fecund activity which led him to publish a number of works of literary merit, including poetry, fine art, and archaeology. His portrait was painted by Peter Fendi in 1822. He died in Vienna in 1829.

== Family ==
In 1801 in Prague he married Thérèse Leenheer van Sleews, who came from a similarly emigrant noble family of Brussels. They had two sons, the diplomat and composer Johann Vesque von Püttlingen (1803-1883), and Karl (Charles).

== Works ==
- Vesque de Puttelange, Jean (1791). Le Roi Guiot, histoire nouvelle, tirée d'un vieux manuscrit poudreux et vermoulu.
