= Johann Vesque von Püttlingen =

Austrian lawyer and diplomat

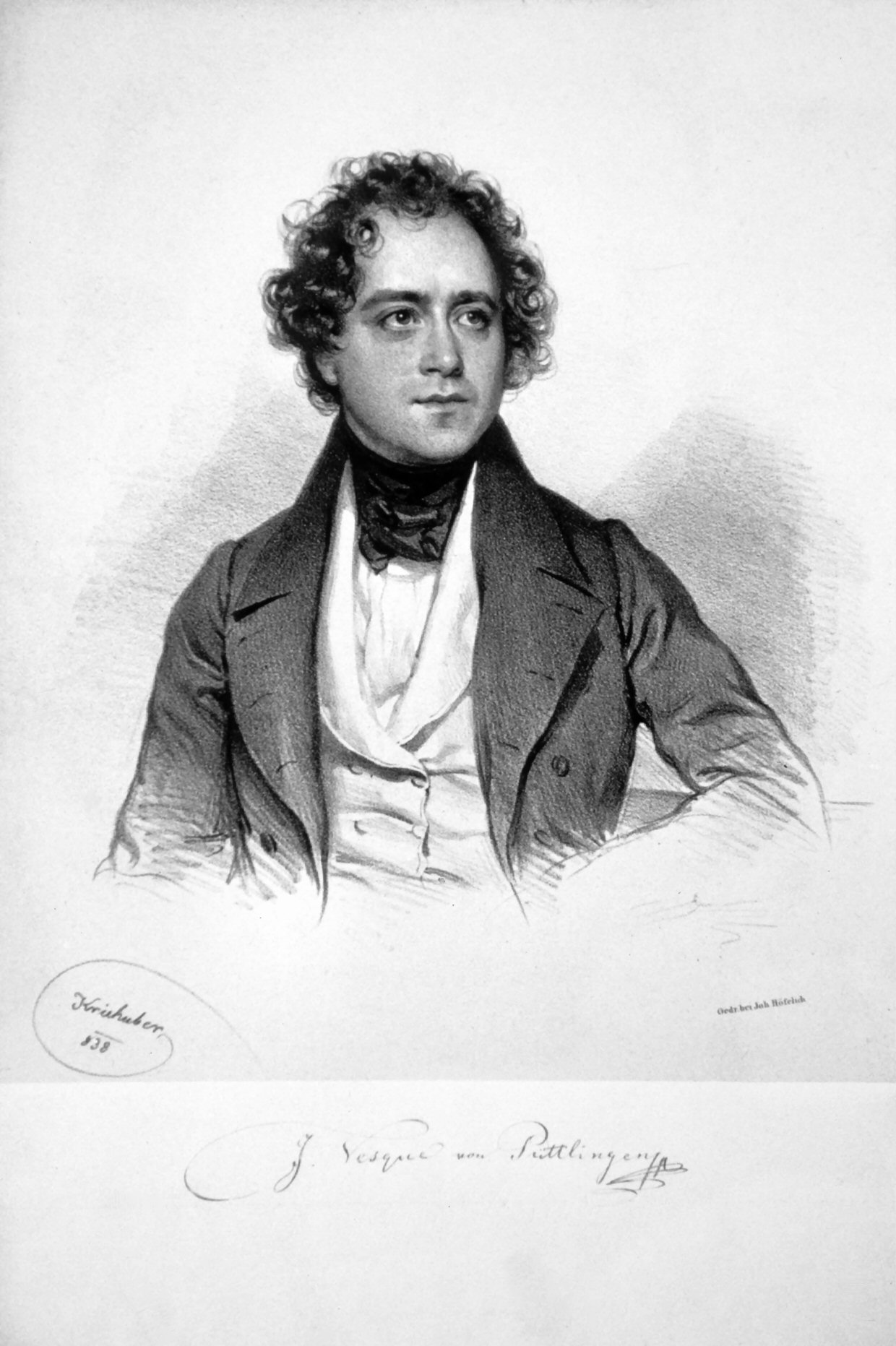
Johann Vesque von Püttlingen in 1838. Lithograph by Josef Kriehuber

Johann Vesque von Püttlingen (pseudonym Johann Hoven) (23 July 1803 – 29 October 1883), born J. Vesque de Puttelange, was an Austrian lawyer, diplomat, author, composer and singer. His full name and title in German was Johann Vesque, Freiherr von Püttlingen.

== Early life ==
He was born in the Lubomirski Palace (pl:Pałac Lubomirskich) in Opole Lubelskie (at the time located in West Galicia, a province of the Holy Roman Empire in eastern Poland, now in Lublin Voivodship).

Background

His father, Jean Vesque de Puttelange, born in Brussels, was a state official (civil servant) in Brussels, at the time in the Duchy of Brabant, a region of the Austrian Netherlands, themselves part of the Holy Roman Empire. Jean Vesque had to leave in a hurry after the French invasion of the Low Countries in 1793, but found himself banned (with the other Belgian officials of the late Brussels administration) from Vienna, where there were enough civil servants already; having rejected a French offer of citizenship of the new greater France - now including southern Belgium and Luxembourg - his estates were confiscated and he found himself stateless.

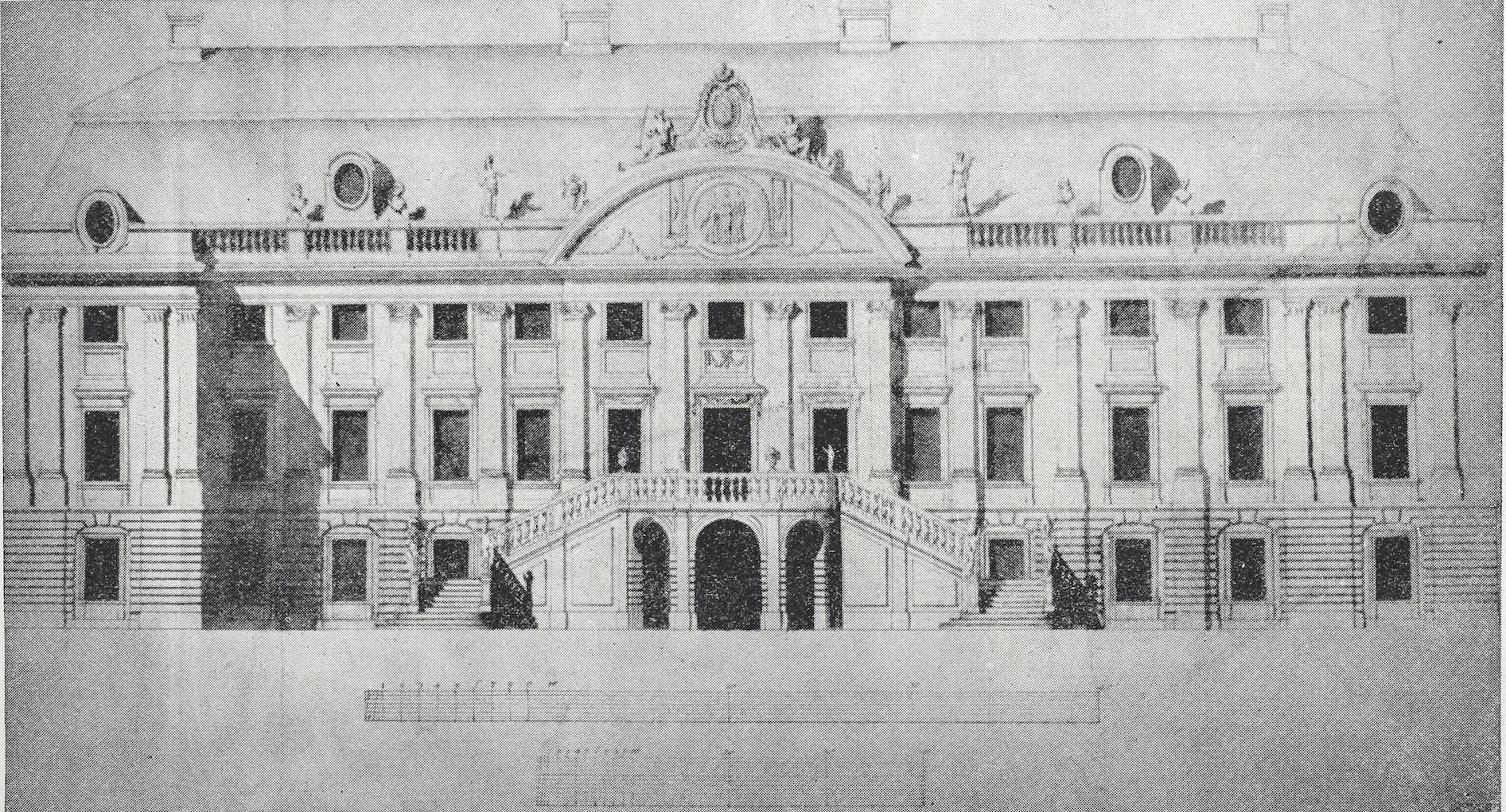
His birthplace, Lubomirski Palace in Opole Lubelskie, designed c.1770 by i.a. Domenico Merlini

After many years of wandering in Europe, often on foot, Jean Vesque obtained a position c1801 at the palace of Prince Alexander Lubomirsky in Opole Lubelskie, where he worked as librarian and tutor to his daughter Alexandra Francis Lubomirska, and where his son, also Johann Vesque (later von Püttlingen), was born in 1803. West Galicia had recently come under Habsburg control after the Third Partition of Poland in 1795.

The ban on Austro-Belgian officials settling in Vienna was lifted the following year, 1804, and the family moved to Vienna. The subsequent life of the infant Johann Vesque divides into two intertwining careers, that of a government official, and that of a composer.

== Civil service career ==
After schooling - including some musical training - he entered the University of Vienna in 1822 to study law, gaining his LLD (Dr. jur.) with honours in 1827. He then became a civil servant, entering the Lower Austrian legal service (or magistracy) as an 'Auscultant' or probationer (Anwärter auf das Richteramt), rising to become chief administrative officer of Salzburg by 1872. He moved to the Austrian diplomatic service, making his way to head of section in the Ministry of Foreign Affairs, and in 1866 he was elevated to the barony (Freiherrenstand). In 1876 he became a Privy Councillor of the Imperial Council.

He was one of Austria's leading lawyers and was also active as a writer in this field: among other things he published a ground-breaking work on "The rights of the musical author" (1864); a description of the law relating to foreign citizens in Austria; and a review of Austria's agreements with foreign states.

== Musical career ==
Aged 13, he had started piano lessons with de:Maximilian Josef Leidesdorf, a well-known pianist who was a friend (and publisher) of Schubert and Beethoven. He studied composition with Eduard von Lannoy, who came from Brussels like Johann's father, Jean Vesque; he got to know Schubert in 1827–8, and through him had singing lessons with the renowned baritone Johann Vogl. The critic Eduard Hanslick described his well-trained tenor voice: "The witty, lightly emphasised, almost French 'breathy' tone, which Vesque - especially in his recital of his humoristic lieder - was aware of putting on, was quite unique." (Note: „Der geistreiche, leicht pointierende, fast französisch angehauchte Ton, den Vesque in den Vortrag namentlich seiner humoristischen Lieder zu legen wusste, war ganz einzig". (Hanslick 1888, pp. 199, 196–203))

Starting in 1828, he published a number of his own compositions under the name 'J. Hoven', or later 'Johann van Hoven'. many of which - like the rest of his oeuvre - were contributions to the lyric vocal repertoire; over 100 of his songs were settings of Heinrich Heine. In total he composed over 330 lieder, notably the Ironischen Lieder; six operas, including Turandot (1838) and Jeanne d'Arc (1840); and about twenty quartets, in both sacred and secular settings. Among his contacts were numbered Robert and Clara Schumann, Hector Berlioz, Franz Liszt, Carl Loewe, Giacomo Meyerbeer, Felix Mendelssohn and Otto Nicolai.

Four of his six operas were successfully produced at the Kärntnertortheater: Turandot 1838, Johanna d’Arc 1840, Liebeszauber 1845, Ein Abenteuer Carl des Zweiten 1850. He helped to reconstruct the threatened Gesellschaft der Musikfreunde, and was its vice-president 1851/52, while continuing on the building of the Conservatory of the GdM, whose director he was. He organised performances of Mendelssohn's oratorios in Vienna, and directed the musical festivals in the Royal winter Spanish Riding School. He was a member of the Royal Commission for the World Fair 1873, and also collected autographs.

He died in Vienna.

== Works ==
According to Grove, his published compositions reach to Opus no. 58.

- Complete list of works

Operas

- Turandot, 2 acts (1838).
  - Overture, arr. piano 4 hands
  - Vocal score arr. composer, .de & .it text
- Joan of Arc, 3 acts (1840). Performed in Dresden in 1845, with Johanna Wagner in the title part. Vocal score by Diabelli
- Liebeszauber 4 acts (1845).
- Catherine de Heilbronn (1847)
- Burg Thaya, 3 acts (1847) ('Thaya Castle'). Apparently not performed.
- Ein Abenteuer Carl des Zweiten, 1 act (1850) ('An adventure of Carl II').
- Der lustiger Rath, 2 acts (1852). Produced at Weimar by Franz Liszt.
- Lips Tullian, 1 act. Not performed.

Operettas reviewed by Hanslick, 15 Jan 1850

Choral works

- Mass in D (1846), for soloists, chorus and orchestra, performed at the Vienna Hofkapelle
- A second Mass.

Piano (and violin)

- Six Cotillons, op. 1, pour le pianoforte
- Twelve Ländler, op. 2, for piano
- Cotillons et galopade, op. 3, piano 4 hands
- Cotillons et galopade, op. 4, arr. for violin and piano
- Flüchtiger Lust. Walzer und Galoppe fur pianoforte, op. 5

Vocal works

- c.300 songs for voice and piano, including
  - Die Heimkehr. Acht und achtzig Gedichte aus Heinrich Heine's Reisebildern in Musik gesetzt von J. Hoven" (Vesque). Wien, aus der konlig. Hof- und Staatsdruckerei, 1851 (Die Heimkehr: 88 poems from Heinrich Heine's 'Travel Pictures')
  - 45 Songs

__

- Balladen, Romanzen und Lieder. 3 Hefte, opp. 6, 7 & 8
  - op. 6. - 2 songs #1. Ritter Toggenburg ('Toggenburg the knight'), text by Friedrich Schiller. #2. Die Eisersucht
  - op. 7 - 3 songs
  - op. 8 - 6 songs, texts by Salis & Heine
- Drei Gedichte, op. 9, from Heine's Reisebildern
- Three songs by Zerboni di Sposetti, op. 10
- Die zwölfte Stunde, op. 11, poems by Heine
- Der Doktor und der Patient, Op. 13, comic duet for two bass voices and piano (ed. Martin Wiener)
- Liebesleiden, op. 21, poems of Heine
- Abendbilder, op. 22, from Heine's Reisebildern
- "Standchen" von Koerner (Serenata), 0p. 24
- Wie der Mond sich leuchtend dränget, op. 27
- "Liebsvoll"
- Sonntag auf dem Meere, 30. Werk (L. A. Frankl) 12 songs for voice & piano, 2 books No. 9 - Goethe Dämmerung
- Vier Lieder by Heinrich Heine, op. 36
- Humoristica from Heine's poems, op. 38
- Six Heine poems, op. 39
- Fünf neue Gedichte von Heinrich Heine, op. 40
- Ironische Lieder von H. Heine op. 41
- Sei ariette dedicate a Mad. Albina Maray, op. 42
- Six songs for alto voice and piano, op. 43
- Songs, op. 44
- 7 Gedichte aus dem "neuen Fruhling" von Heine, op. 45
- Six poems from 'New Spring' by Heine, op. 46
- Sechs Gedichte von Chamisso, op. 47 (2 Hefte)
- Three songs, op. 48
- Six songs, op. 49
- Three songs, op. 51
- Six songs, opp, 52, 54, 55, 56
- Lieder frommer Stimmung, op. 57

__

- Liebesrauch, von J. Hoven (Curci, C. "L'estasi di amore" di G. Perruzzini)
- "Der Sängerskampf", komische Ballade, text von August Schmidt (1843)

__

- Jagers Qual (von Seidl), for tenor, horn and piano

Vocal ensemble

- Vocal quartets, op. 20 for male quartet
