= Daszewski =

Dashewski, feminine:Dashevska is a Polish surname derived from the settlement of Dashev. Russia-language equivalent: Dashevsky. Notable people with the surname include:

- Jan Daszewski (1916–1942), fighter pilot in the Polish Air Force in World War II
- Wiktor Daszewski (1936–2021), Polish archeologist
- Władysław Daszewski (1902–1971), Polish scenographer and caricaturist
