= Dashevsky =

Dashevsky, feminine:Dashevskaya is a Russian surname derived from the settlement of Dashev. Polish-language equivalent: Daszewski. Notable people with the surname include:

- Galina Dashevskaya (1941–2020), Russian actress
- Yakov Dashevsky (1902–1972), Soviet Red Army military intelligence officer and lieutenant-general
