= Jan Mikołaj Chodkiewicz =

Polish–Lithuanian noble (1738–1781)

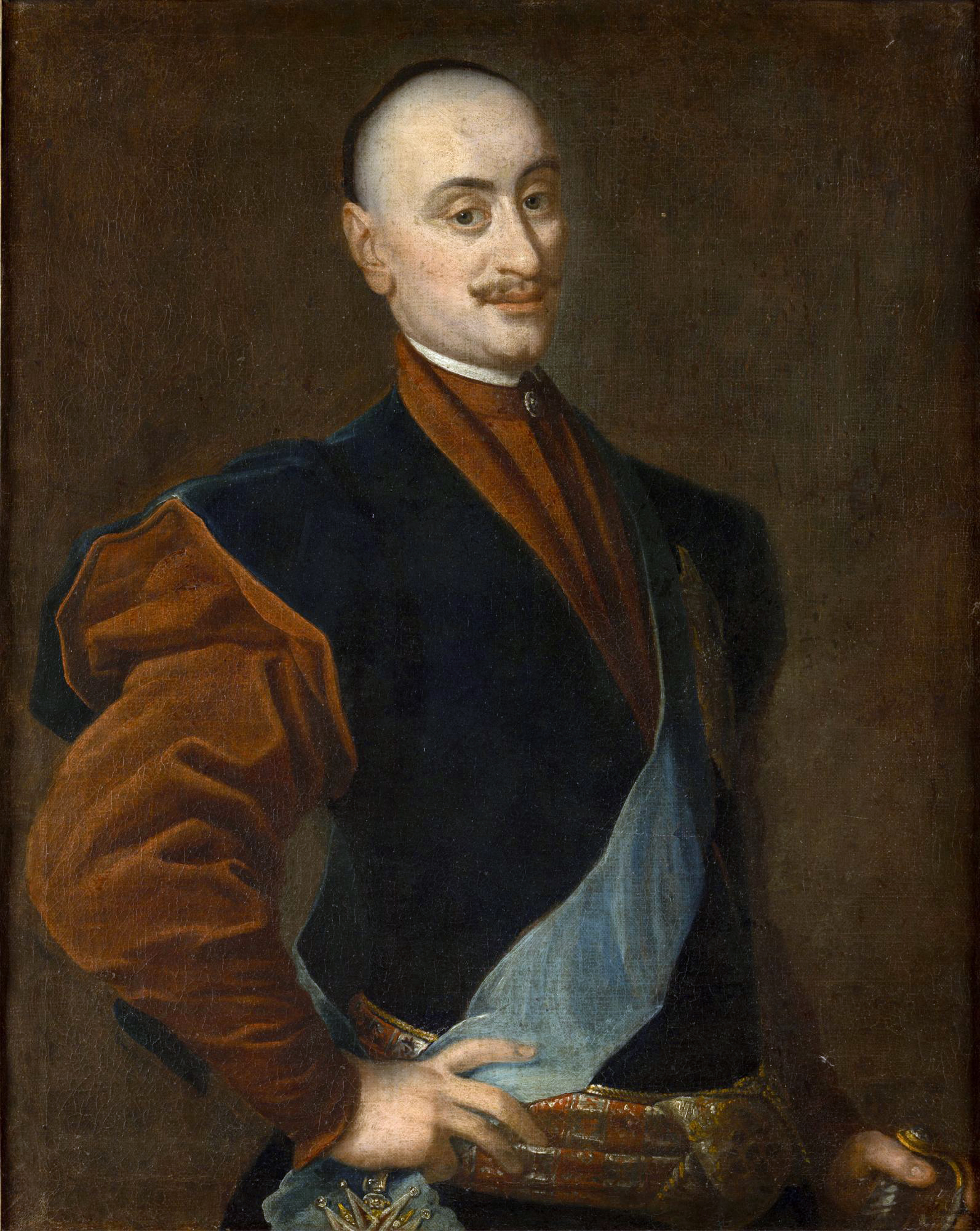
Jan Mikołaj Chodkiewicz (1770s, artist unknown)

Count Jan Mikołaj Chodkiewicz (Lithuanian: Jonas Mikalojus Ksaveras Chodkevičius; 14 December 1738, Gdańsk – 2 February 1781, Chernobyl) was the starost of Samogitia and Veliuona; count of Shklow and Nowa Mysz.

== Biography ==
His father, Adam Tadeusz Chodkiewicz, was the Voivode of Brest-Litovsk. In 1757, after completing his studies at Vilnius University, he was appointed a Colonel to His Majesty. From 1758 to 1759, he fought in the Seven Years' War on the side of the French Royal Army.

In 1764, he became a Colonel and Counselor in the Polish–Lithuanian Commonwealth. He was also elected to the Convocation Sejm, representing the Duchy of Samogitia, and was an Elector for Stanisław August Poniatowski. That same year, his troops raided the Radziwiłł palace complex in Biała Podlaska. His actions led to his being named a general officer in the Order of Saint Stanislaus.

In 1766, he was appointed a Senator At-large. That same year, he married Maria Ludwika Rzewuska (1744-1816), daughter of the poet and Hetman, Wacław Rzewuski. They had four sons and two daughters, including Aleksander Chodkiewicz, a noted Polish patriot, and Rozalia Lubomirska, whose execution in France created an international incident.

During the Bar Confederation, he avoided making any firm commitments. While lamenting the sorry state of his oppressed country, he supported the Prussian and Russian commanders who were protecting his personal properties. Nevertheless, in 1774, he was awarded the Order of the White Eagle. In 1778, he was made a Lieutenant General in the Imperial Russian Army, but resigned after only a short time.
