= Aleksander Lubomirski (1751–1804) =

Polish nobleman

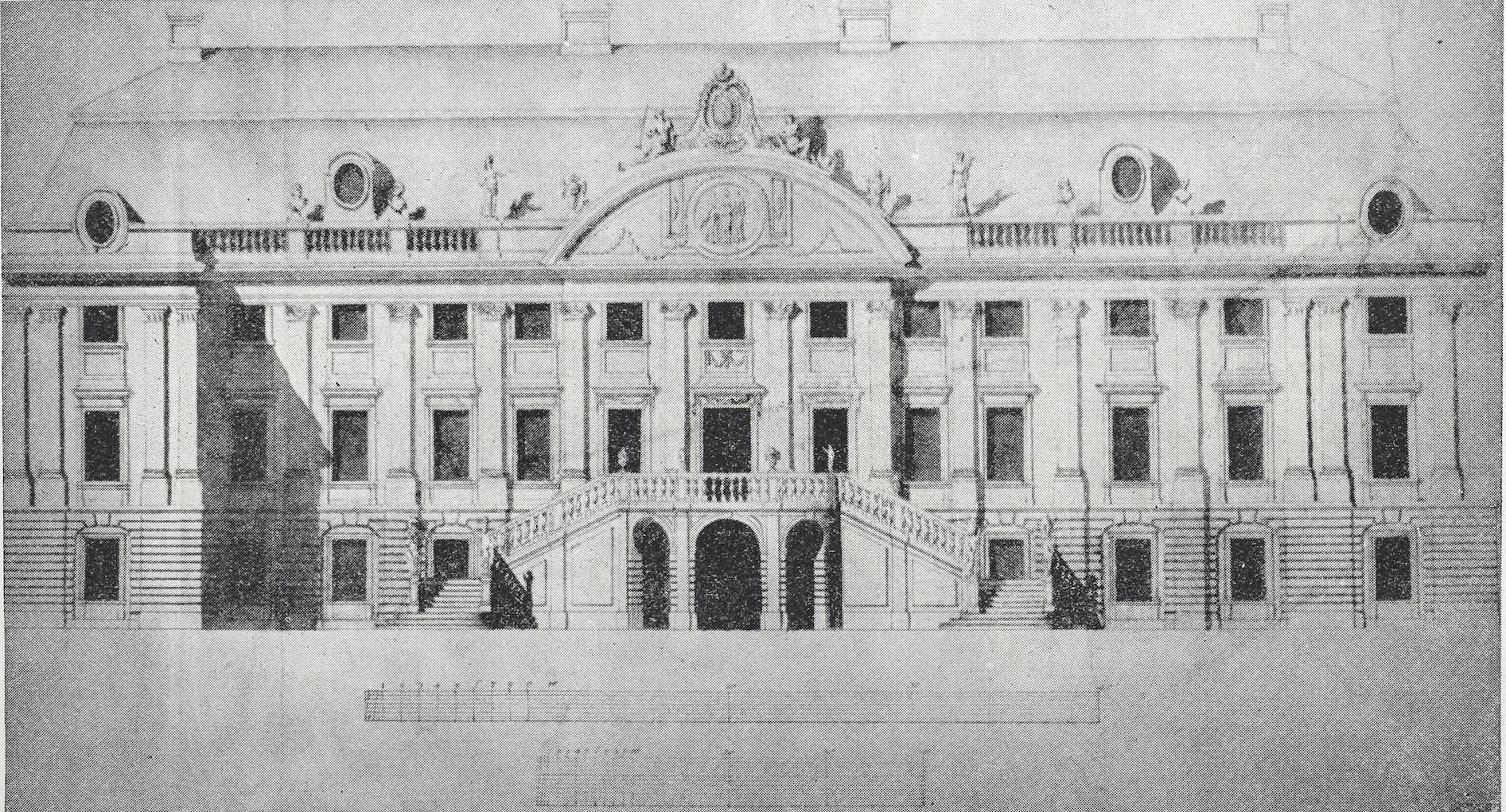
Lubomirski Palace in Opole Lubelskie c1770

Prince Aleksander Lubomirski (1751 in Kiev – 14 July 1804 in Vienna) was a Polish nobleman, Castellan of Kiev 1785–1790. Son of Stanisław Lubomirski.

Inherited Lubomirski Palace, Opole Lubelskie, from his uncle Antoni Lubomirski, son of Prince Jozef Lubomirski. Married in 1787 to Rozalia Chodkiewicz, who was arrested on espionage charges in Paris during the Reign of Terror and guillotined in 1794 aged 23. They had one daughter, Alexandra Francis Lubomirska, (after her mother's death, also called Rozalia, Rosalie etc.) who married the orientalist Count "Emir" Wacław Seweryn Rzewuski in Vienna in 1804.
