= Alexandra Francis Rzewuska =

Polish aristocrat and artist (1788–1865)

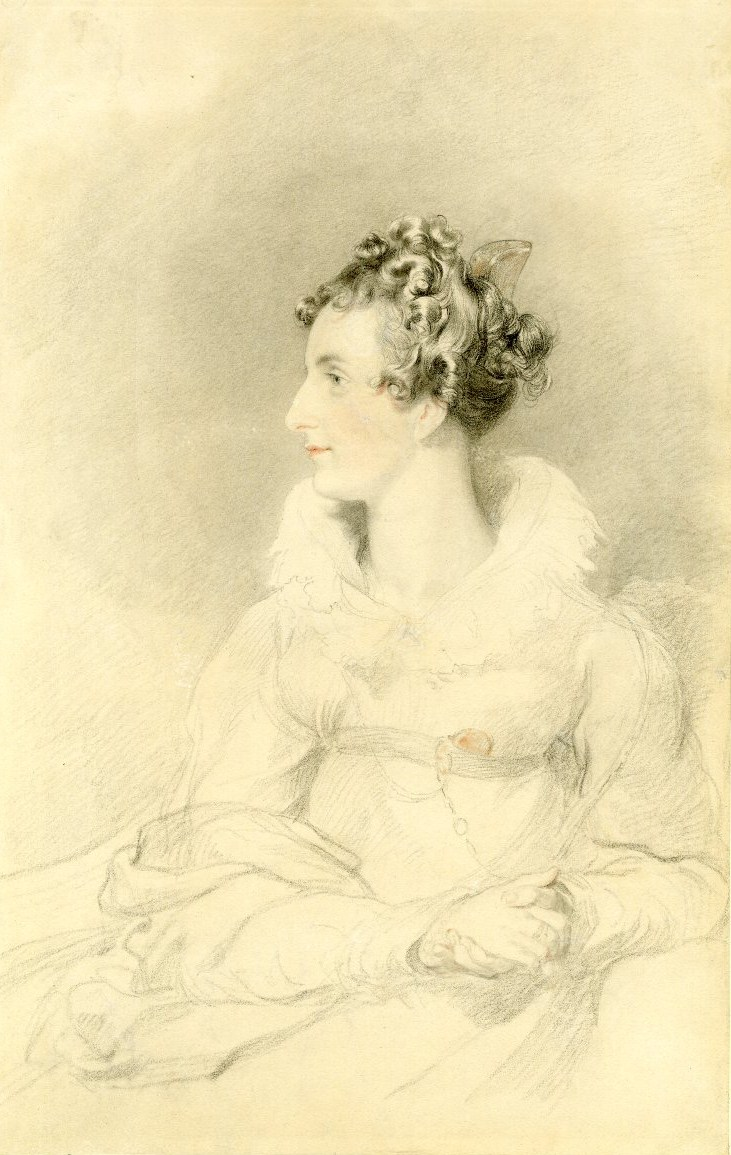
Portrait by Thomas Lawrence, 1818

Aleksandra Franciszka Lubomirska (nicknamed Rosalie by her father) (1788 in Kiev – 11 January 1865 in Warsaw) was a Polish aristocrat, artist and writer from the Lubomirski family. She was the daughter of Prince Alexander Lubomirski, Castellan of Kiev (Kijów), and Rozalia Lubomirska, née Chodkiewicz.

== Life ==
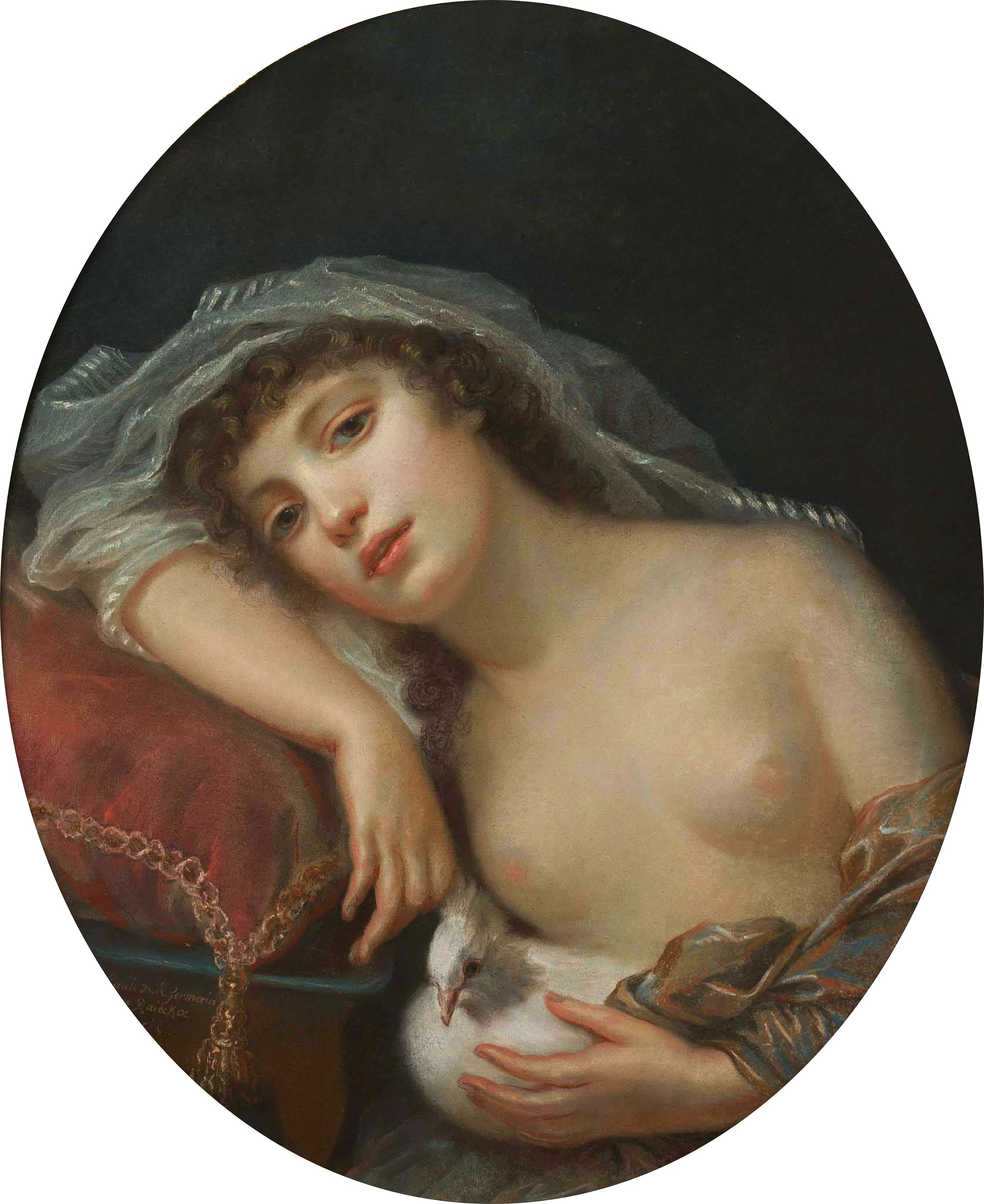
Her mother, Rozalia Lubomirska, painted c1789–1790 by Anna Rajecka

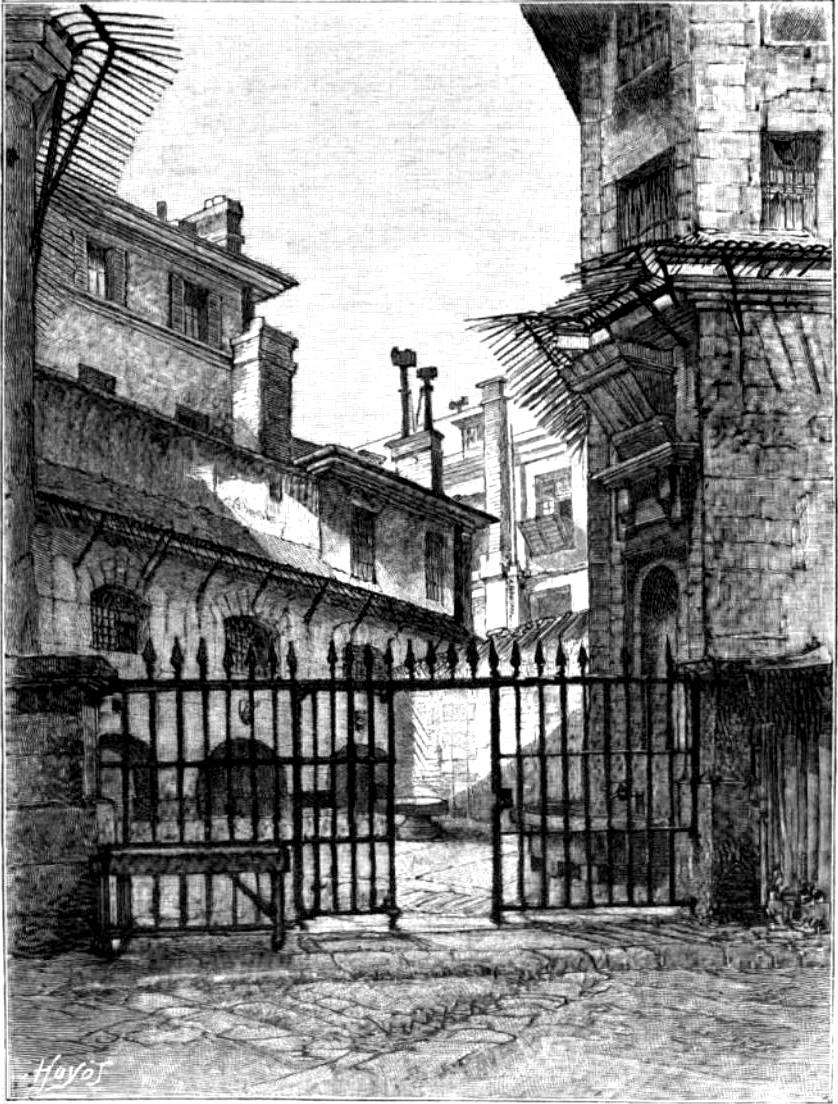
The women's courtyard in the Conciergerie prisons, where she was held, aged 7, in 1794

In 1794 her mother, Rozalia, was living in Paris and was arrested during the Reign of Terror; her house was frequented by British spies and Girondin counter-revolutionaries. The seven year-old Rosalie was incarcerated with her mother, who was guillotined on 30 June 1794 aged 25. The child was left alone, at the mercy of the prison gaoler, who ill-treated her and almost refused her dry bread, the only food she had.

Rosalie's father was a General in the French Army but was away just then and unaware of his little girl's fate. He heard of it at last and sent for her, and the person he commissioned to fetch her arrived three days before she was to have been sent to the Foundling Hospital of Paris. She was released after the Thermidorian Reaction (9 Thermidor, Year 11, 27 July 1794) and the death of Maximilien Robespierre the following day.

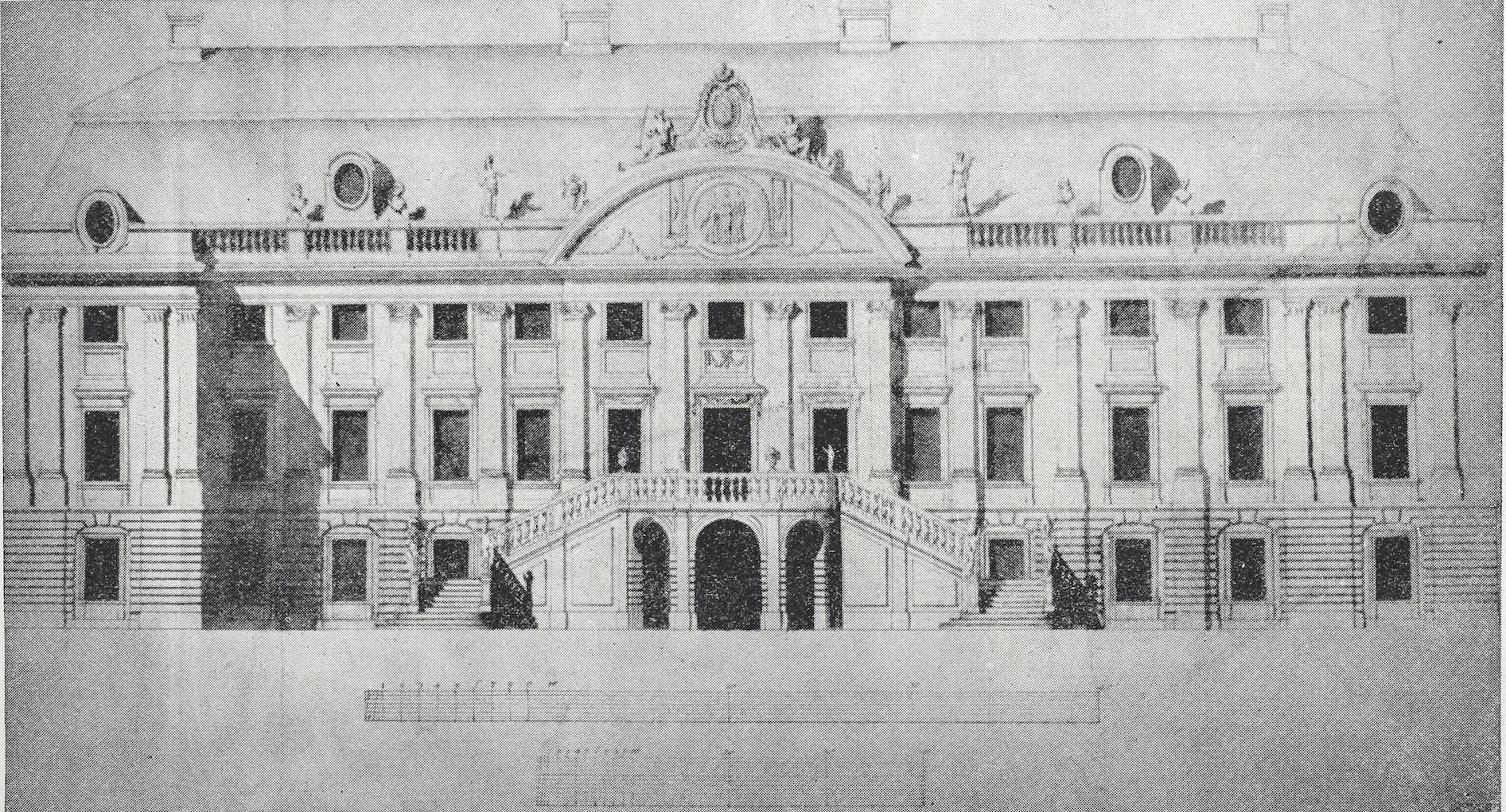
The Lubomirski Palace (c1770) in Opole Lubelskie, designed by Domenico Merlini

She returned to her father's house, the Lubomirski Palace in Opole Lubelskie, West Galicia (now in Lublin Voivodship, Poland. (Note: West Galicia was annexed by the Habsburg monarchy, after the Third Partition of Poland in 1795.) In around 1800 her tutor was the exiled Jean Vesque de Puttelange, previously an official in the government of the Habsburg Netherlands (now Belgium); his own country had been invaded in 1794 and annexed by the French Republic in 1795, a few months after her mother had been executed. Vesque's son, the lawyer and composer Johann Vesque von Püttlingen, was born in 1803 in the palace, and Alexandra held him at his christening.

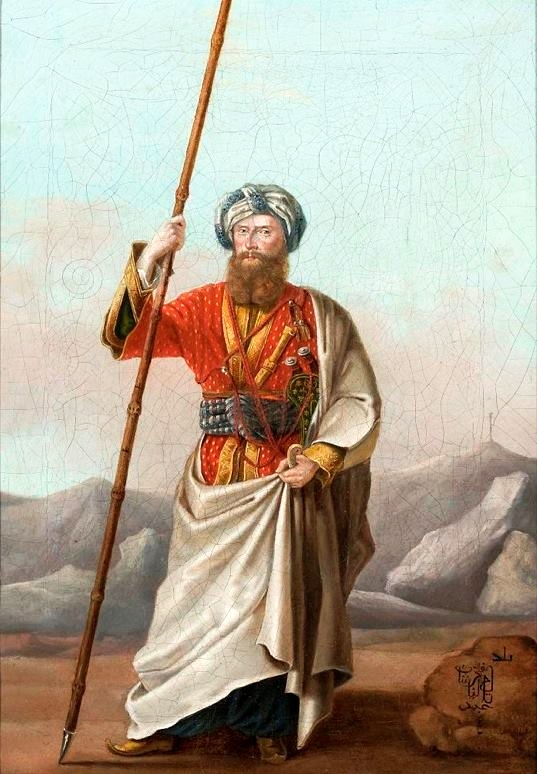
Her husband, W. S. Rzewuski

According to the memoirs of Countess Varvara Golovina, the "extraordinary opening to her life seems to have been only a preparation for every virtue, and her mind is the flower of her soul." In 1805 she married the orientalist Wacław Seweryn Rzewuski (nicknamed "Emir") in Vienna, and was the mother of Stanislaw Rzewuski, a historian of philosophy, and of Leons Rzewuski.
