= Dashiv =

Rural locality in Vinnytsia Oblast, Ukraine

Dashiv Дашів
- Rural settlement
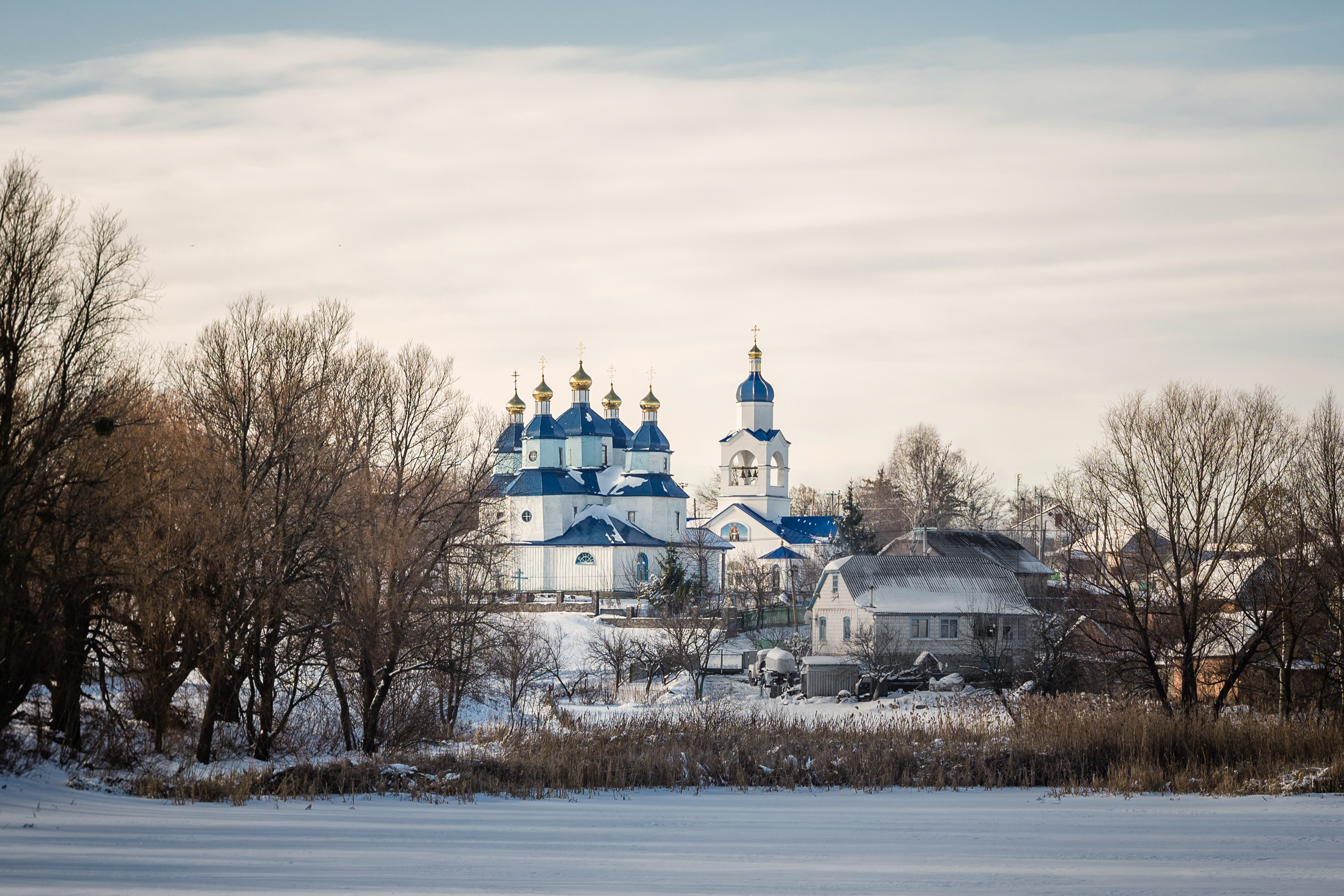
- Saint Michael's Church

- Location in Vinnytsia Oblast Location in Ukraine
- Coordinates: 49°00′14″N 29°26′20″E
- Country: Ukraine
- Oblast: Vinnytsia Oblast
- Raion: Haisyn Raion
- Hromada: Dashiv settlement hromada

Population (2022)
  - Total: 3,762
- Time zone: UTC+2 (EET)
  - Summer (DST): UTC+3 (EEST)

Dashiv (Ukrainian: Дашів; Polish: Daszów) is a rural settlement in Haisyn Raion of Vinnytsia Oblast in Ukraine. It is located on the banks of the Sob, a left tributary of the Southern Bug. Dashiv hosts the administration of Dashiv settlement hromada, one of the hromadas of Ukraine. Population: 3,762 (2022 estimate) It is located in the historic region of Podolia.

== History ==
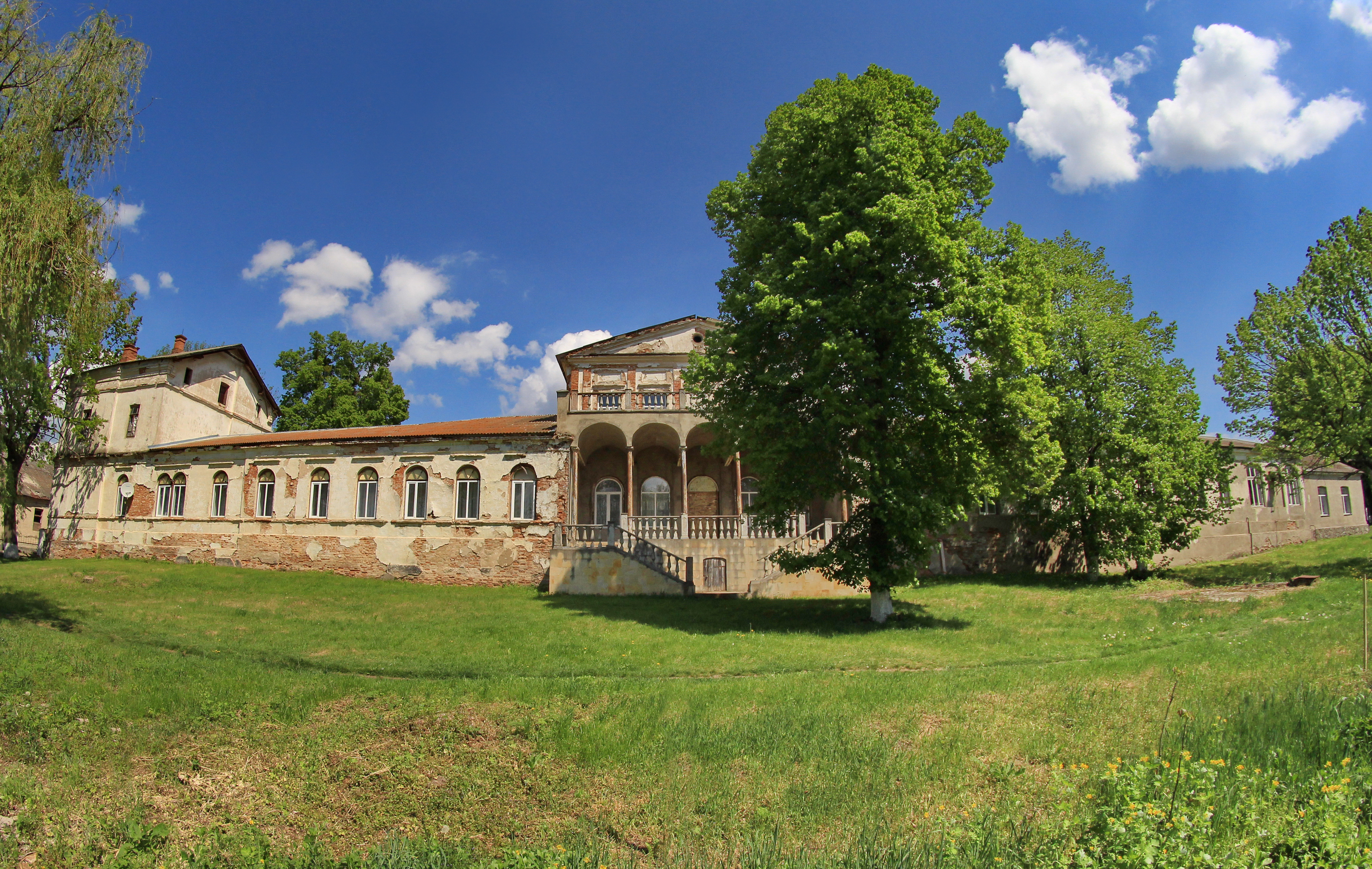
Potocki Palace

Daszów, as it was known in Polish, was a private town, administratively located in the Winnica County in the Bracław Voivodeship in the Lesser Poland Province of the Kingdom of Poland. In 1585, the town was purchased by the Zbaraski family. In the 1630s, it passed to the Wiśniowiecki family, and in 1641 Konstanty Wiśniowiecki pawned it to Stefan Czetwertyński-Światopełk.

In 1648 a battle between Cossacks of Maksym Kryvonis and Polish troops of Jeremi Wiśniowiecki took place in the vicinity. In 1672 Dashiv passed to the Ottoman Empire, and in 1699 returned to Poland. In 1737 it was the site of a skirmish between haydamaks and Polish dragoons. In the mid-18th century, Daszów passed to the Plater family. The town was attacked by the haydamaks during the Koliivshchyna in 1768, however, local nobility managed to flee and find shelter in the nearby village of Kopijówka.

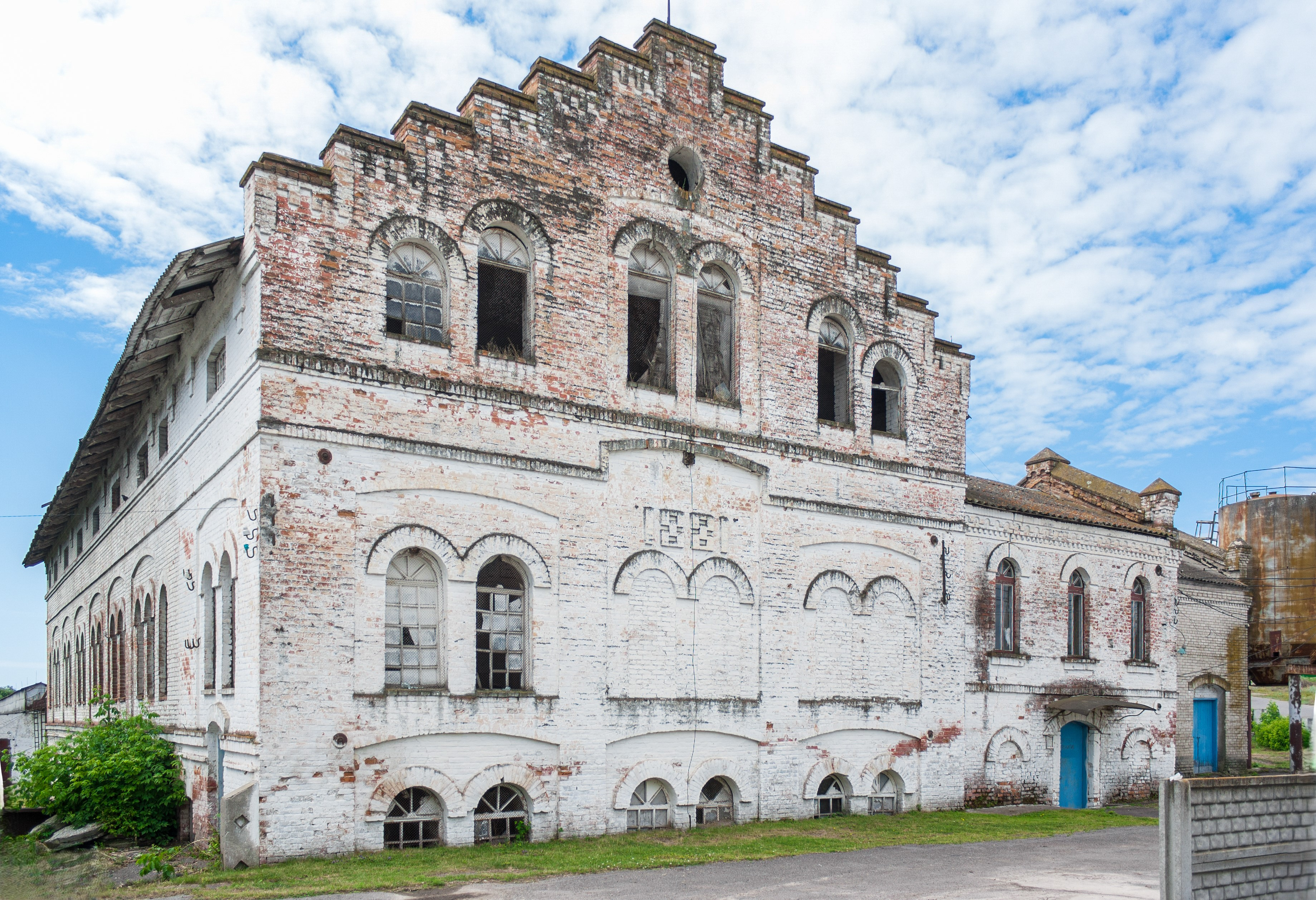
Old watermill

The town was annexed by the Russian Empire in the Second Partition of Poland in 1793. A battle of the November Uprising between Polish insurgents and Russian troops was fought near the town on 14 May 1831. Explorer, poet and orientalist Wacław Seweryn Rzewuski went missing in action during the battle. In October 1919 Dashiv was the site of a battle between the forces of Ukrainian Galician Army and Ukrainian People's Army on one side and Volunteer Army on the other.

During World War II, the town was captured by German forces on 25 July 1941. In 1941, the Germans established a Judenrat and two open ghettos in the town. The ghettos were liquidated in October–December 1941, with 1,016 Jews massacred in four mass executions by the German forces and Ukrainian Auxiliary Police.

Until 18 July 2020, Dashiv belonged to Illintsi Raion. The raion was abolished in July 2020 as part of the administrative reform of Ukraine, which reduced the number of raions of Vinnytsia Oblast to six. The area of Illintsi Raion was split between Haisyn and Vinnytsia Raions, with Dashiv being transferred to Haisyn Raion.

Until 26 January 2024, Dashiv was designated urban-type settlement. On this day, a new law entered into force which abolished this status, and Dashiv became a rural settlement.

== Economy ==
=== Transportation ===
The closest railway stations are in Haisyn and in Kryshtopivka, both on the railway line connecting Vinnytsia with Khrystynivka and Vapniarka. There is infrequent passenger traffic.

The settlement is connected by road to Haisyn and Vinnytsia, where it has access to Highway M30 connecting Stryi and Dnipro.
