= Rozalia Lubomirska =

Polish noblewoman (1768–1794)

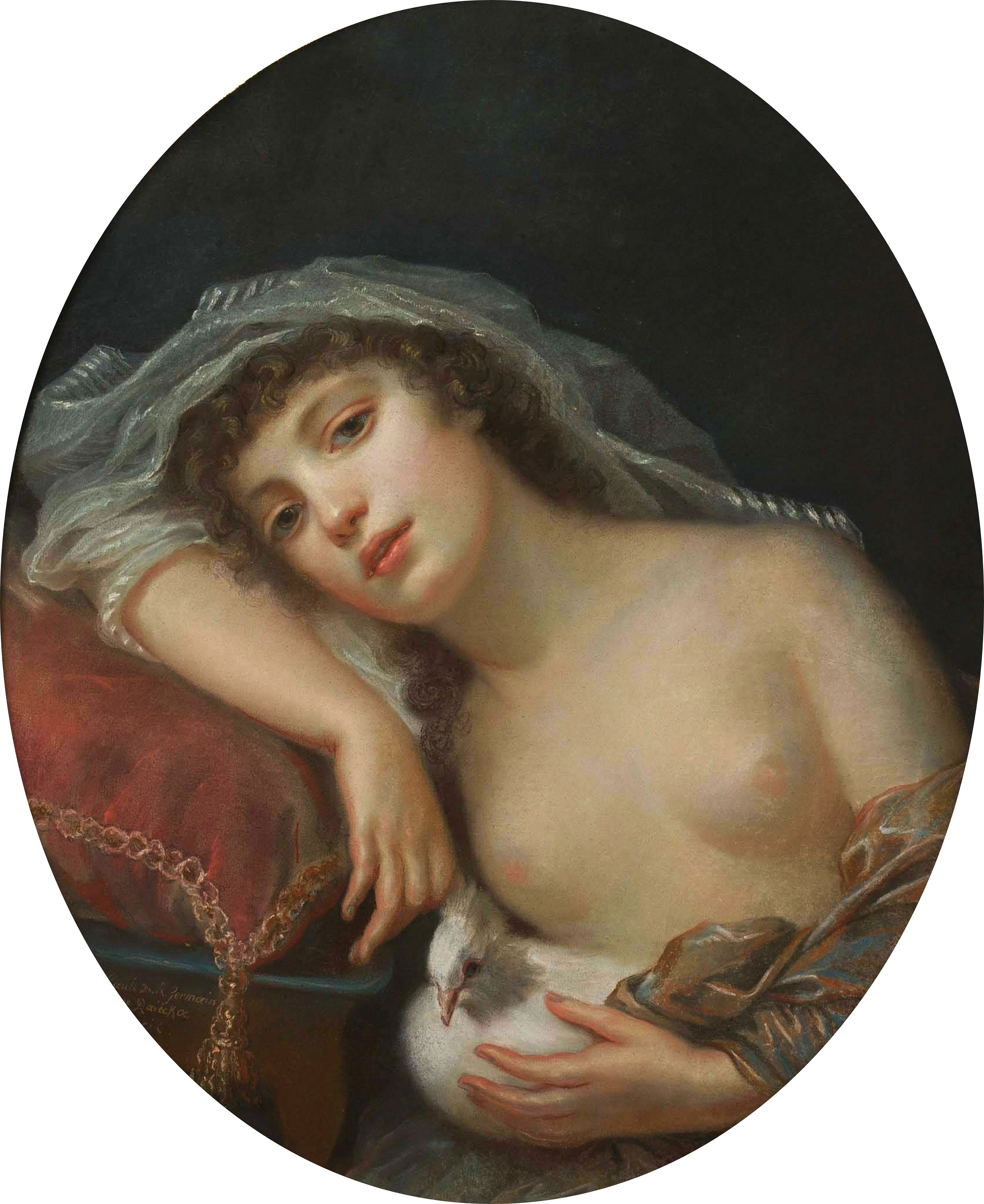
- Portrait by Anna Rajecka, 1789–1790

- Coat of arms
- Born: 16 November 1768; Chernobyl, Polish–Lithuanian Commonwealth
- Died: 29 June 1794 (aged 25); Paris, France
- Family: Chodkiewicz
- Husband: Aleksander Lubomirski
- Father: Jan Mikołaj Chodkiewicz
- Mother: Maria Ludwika Rzewuska

Rozalia Lubomirska (née Chodkiewicz; 16 September 1768 in Chernobyl – 29 June 1794 in Paris) was a Polish noblewoman, most noted for her death.

== Life ==
She was the daughter of Count Jan Mikołaj Chodkiewicz and Countess Maria Ludwika Rzewuska, who was a daughter of hetman and writer Wacław Rzewuski.

She was married in 1787 (at the age of 19) to Prince Aleksander Lubomirski. A year later she bore their daughter, Aleksandra.

Known for her beauty, Rozalia travelled to France, where she was rumoured to have some romantic affairs. Anna Rajecka's painting Girl with a Dove comes from that period. The allegory of virginity and innocence was meant to contradict the widespread gossip.

Unhappy in her marriage, she decided to divorce her husband and did not accompany him on his way back to Poland. During the Revolution she was arrested along with her child, and tried for alleged conspiracy against the Revolution, and cooperation with the royalists. As a result, the 25-year-old princess was sentenced to death and soon beheaded by guillotine, although her guilt was, and remained, widely questioned.

The death of a Polish national caused much concern among the Polish nobility who, prior to the Reign of Terror, openly cheered the Revolution. Lubomirska's husband, who returned to France to help her, as well as other Poles present in Paris at that time, vouched for her innocence. Among those who spoke in her defence were such great friends of liberty as Tadeusz Kościuszko, the Polish-American revolutionary, who was granted honorary French citizenship during the Revolution.

Following Rozalia's death, her daughter, Aleksandra Lubomirska, was released from prison and given under the guardianship of Izabella Leżeńska.

After her death, Rozalia became the subject of legends. According to one, her ghost appears in the Lubomirski's palace in Opole Lubelskie. The writer Adolf Dygasiński claimed he saw her ghost.

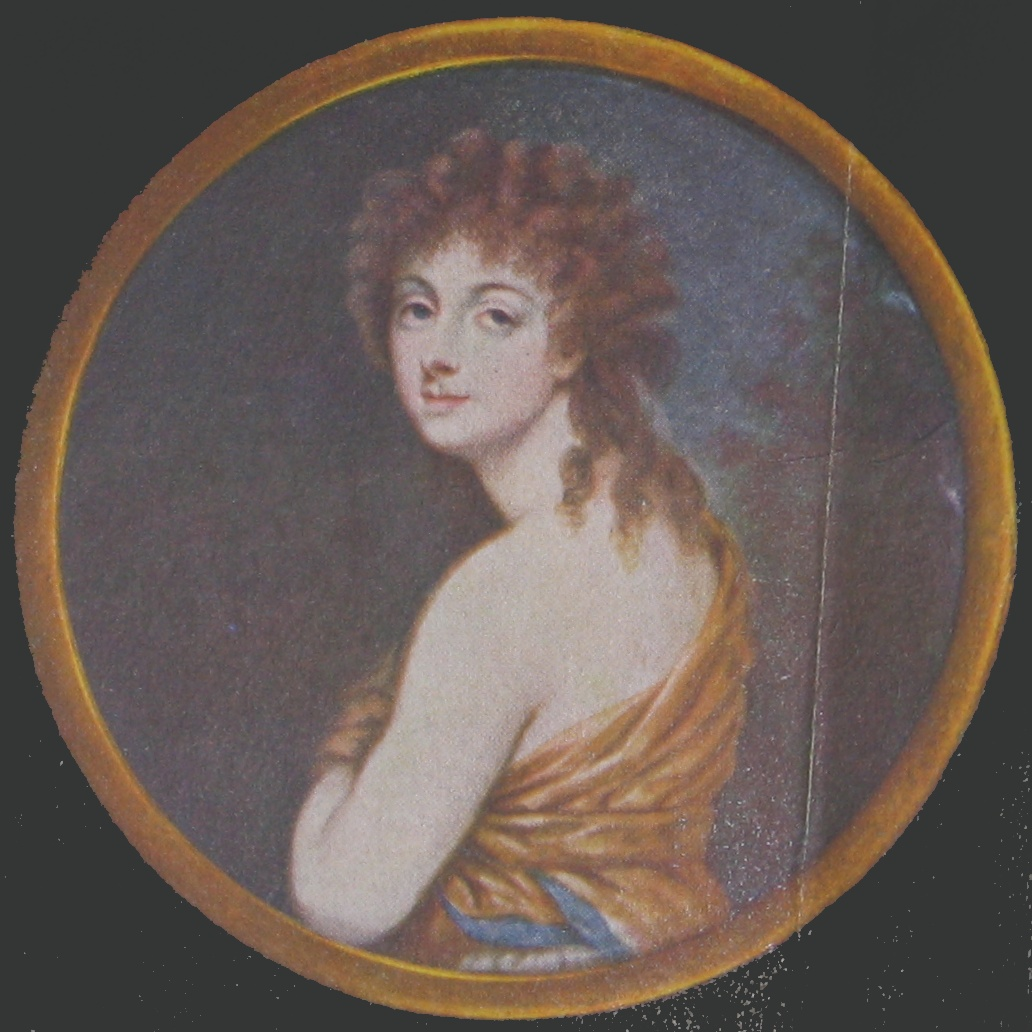
Rozalia Lubomirska.

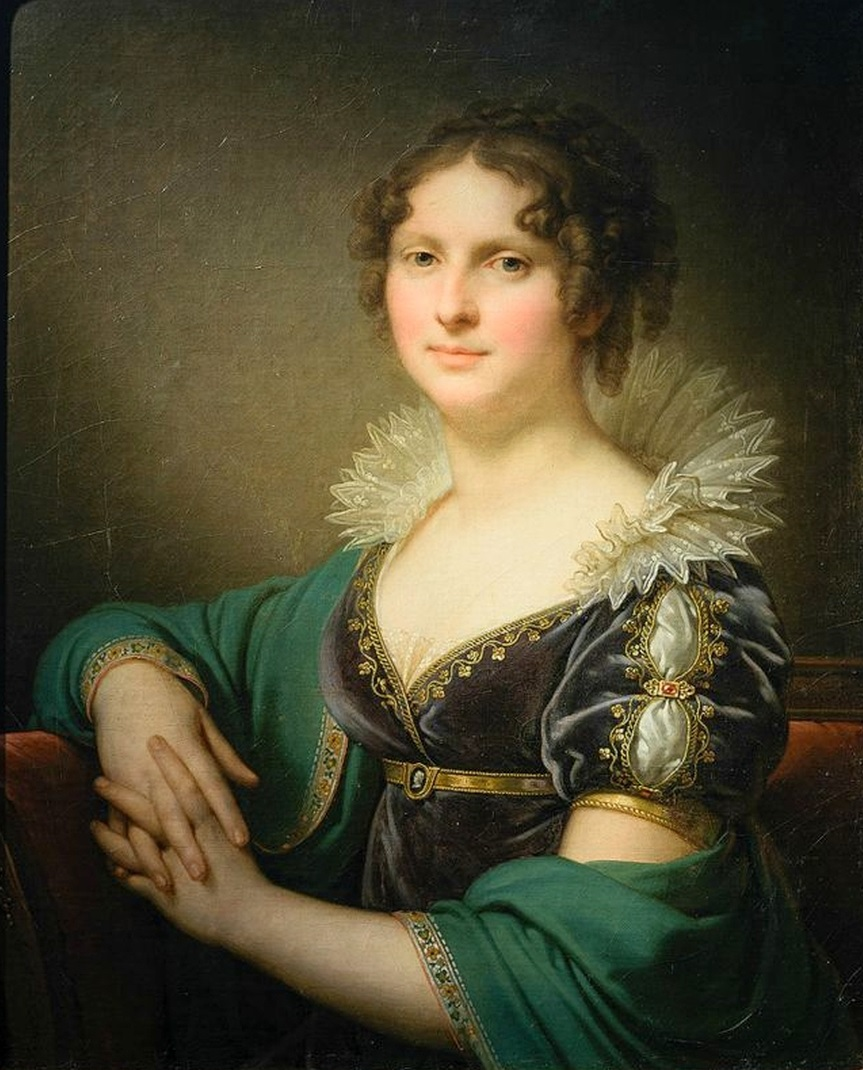
Rozalia's daughter Alexandra Francis Rzewuska, 1814. They were incarcerated together during the Terror.
