= Wacław Seweryn Rzewuski =

Polish explorer and poet (1784–1831)

Emir Taj al-Fahr Abd al-Niszan
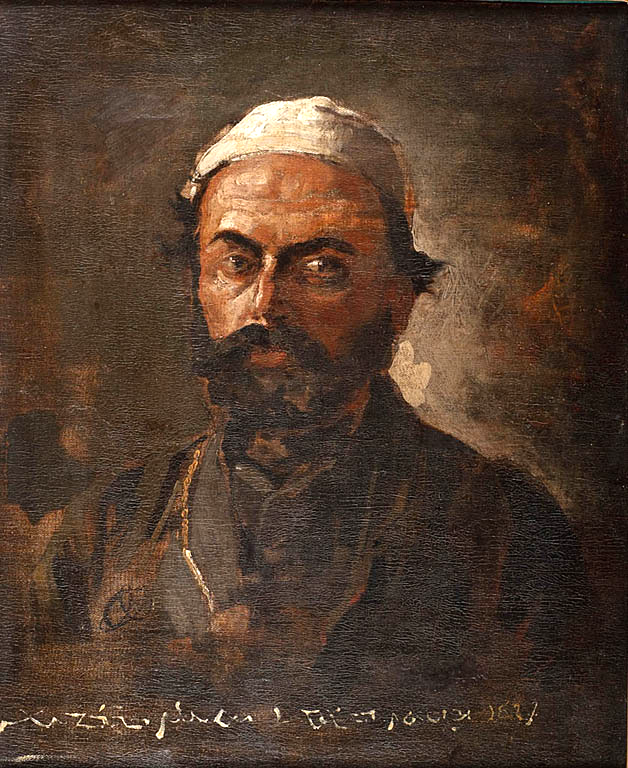

- Coat of arms
- Born: Wacław Seweryn Rzewuski; 15 December 1784; Lwów, Kingdom of Galicia and Lodomeria
- Died: 14 May 1831 (aged 46); Daszów area, Podolia
- Noble family: Rzewuski
- Consorts: Rozalia Aleksandra Lubomirska h. Szreniawa
- Father: Seweryn Rzewuski
- Mother: Konstancja Małgorzata Lubomirska

Wacław Seweryn Rzewuski (15 December 1784 – 14 May 1831) was a Polish explorer, poet, orientalist and horse expert.

== Early life ==
Wacław Rzewuski was born 15 December 1784 in Lwów. He was the son of field Hetman Seweryn Rzewuski whose family held enormous estates in Ukraine, and Princess Konstancja Małgorzata Lubomirska of the influential Lubomirski family. His parents moved the family to Vienna after the Third Partition of Poland and he was educated at the elite Theresianum. In 1806 he married Alexandra, another descendant of the Lubomirski family.

He served in the Austrian army, fighting at Aspern-Essling in 1809, as a second lieutenant in the regiment of Hussars and was dismissed in 1811. During his time in Vienna, his relative, the famous traveler and adventurer, Jan Potocki, stirred his interest in travel to the lands of the Middle East and he took up the study of Turkish and Arabic. Together with the pioneering Austrian orientalist, Joseph von Hammer-Purgstall, he founded one of the first professional journals of Middle East and Islamic Studies, Mines de l'Orient (Fundgruben des Orients) (Fontes rerum orientalium)(Sources for Oriental Studies) which was published in six folio volumes from 1809 to 1819.

== Travels and publishing ==
He eventually became a member of the scientific society in Göttingen, the Munich Academy of Sciences and a member of the Warsaw Society of Friends of Learning.

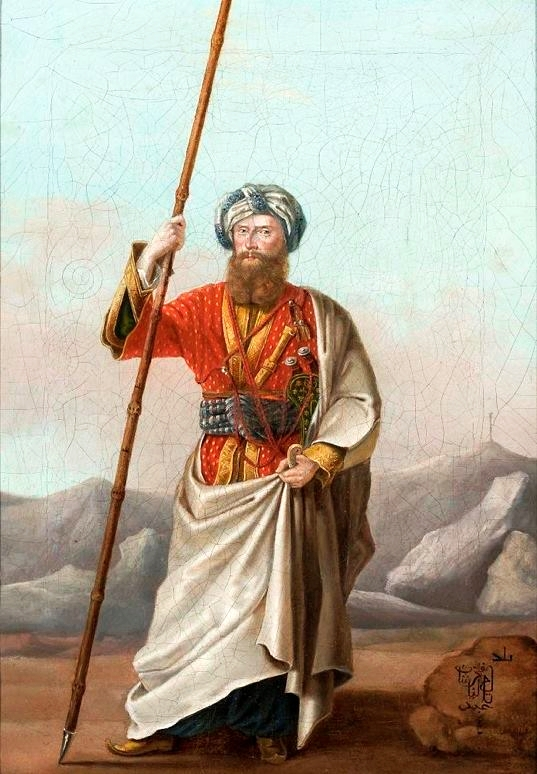
W. S. Rzewuski

In the years 1818-1820 he travelled the Middle East, visiting Syria, Iraq, Lebanon, Palestine, after which he settled in Podolia. During his year of travel he was admitted to 13 tribes and is reputed to have received the title of Emir Taj al-Fahr (transl. Crown of glory) and Abd al-Niszan (transl. servant of the sign). His Arabic name is a direct translation of his name in its old Slavonic meaning, Viacheslav, or 'Crown of Glory', later becoming Wacław.

His publications included the plan of the mosque in Mecca, maps of Persia and the Arabian Peninsula and he recorded the music of the Bedouin.

He published Sur les chevaux orientaux et provenants des races orientales which contains more than 400 full-color drawings, recording culture and customs of Saudi Arabian Desert.

He returned to the Intermarium settling in his native Podolia with a rich collection of Oriental manuscripts, books, costumes, weapons, and pipes. He also began researching Ukrainian folk customs at this time.

== Later years ==
From 1825 he belonged to the Patriotic Society and was arrested in 1826 and held for two years. He was later involved in the November Uprising of 1830 Commanding a Division in the battle of Daszów. He was killed in mysterious circumstances on 14 May 1831.
