= Opole Lubelskie =

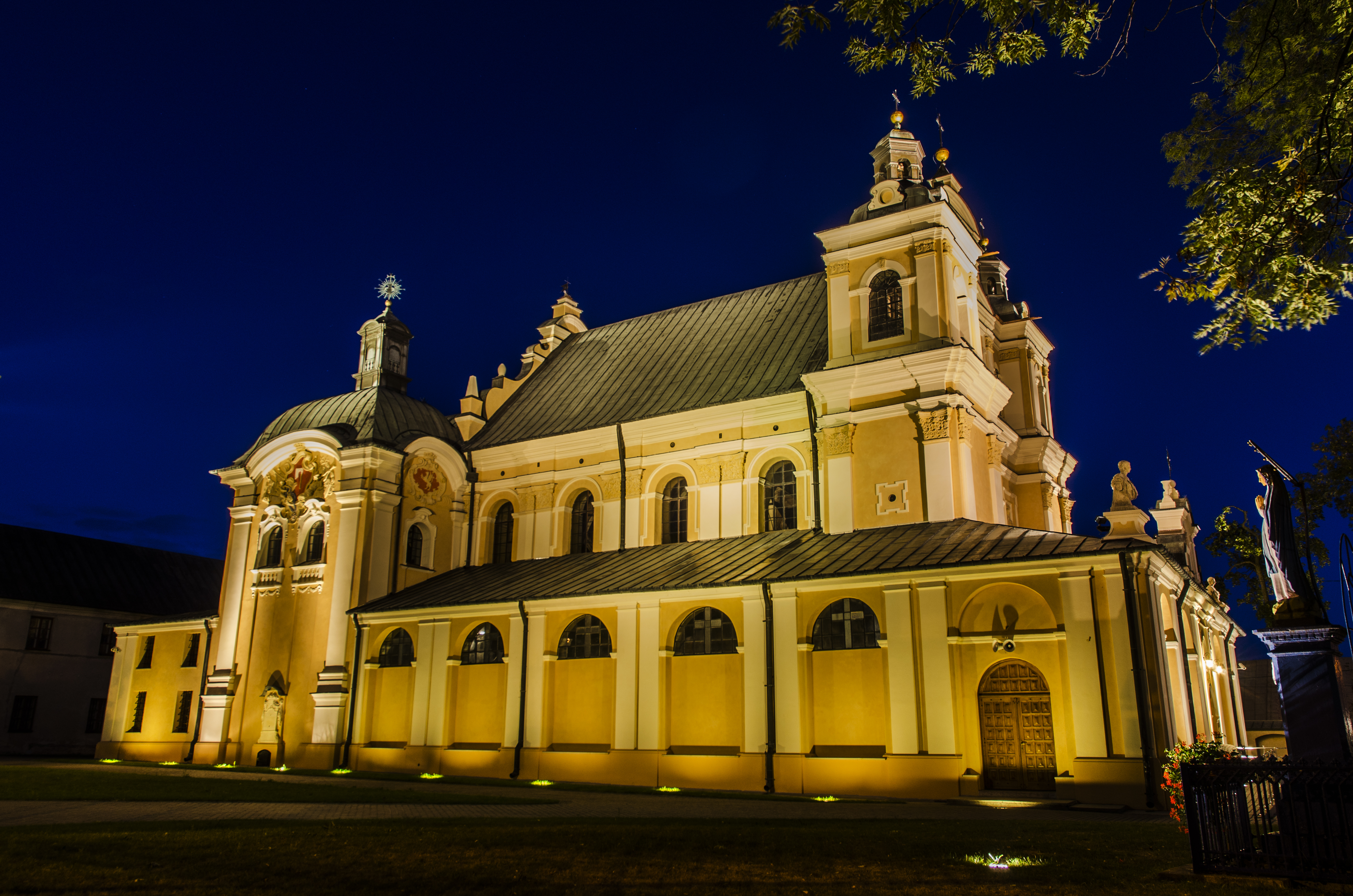
- Baroque Church of the Assumption in Opole Lubelskie

- Coat of arms

- Location within Poland
- Coordinates: 51°9′N 21°58′E
- Country: Poland
- Voivodeship: Lublin
- County: Opole
- Gmina: Opole Lubelskie

Government
  - Mayor: Sławomir Plis (PiS)

Area
  - Total: 15.12 km^{2} (5.84 sq mi)

Population (2006)
  - Total: 8,832
  - Density: 584.1/km^{2} (1,513/sq mi)
- Time zone: UTC+1 (CET)
  - Summer (DST): UTC+2 (CEST)
- Postal code: 24-300
- Car plates: LOP
- Website: opolelubelskie.pl

Opole Lubelskie [ɔˈpɔlɛ luˈbɛlskʲɛ] is a town in southeastern Poland. As of 2004, it had 8,879 inhabitants. The town is situated in Lublin Voivodeship, some 10 kilometers east of the Vistula River, and is the capital of Opole County. It was founded in the 14th century, and historically belongs to Lublin Land, which is part of Lesser Poland.

== Etymology ==
The word "opole" comes from a Slavic language root, and designates a basic unit of Slavic tribal territory. Tribal organization, based on the opole, remained operative in Poland until the Middle Ages. There are several places named Opole in Poland, the best known being in Upper Silesia. To distinguish between these two, the adjective "Lubelskie" was added to the name of the town that is located near the city of Lublin.

== History ==
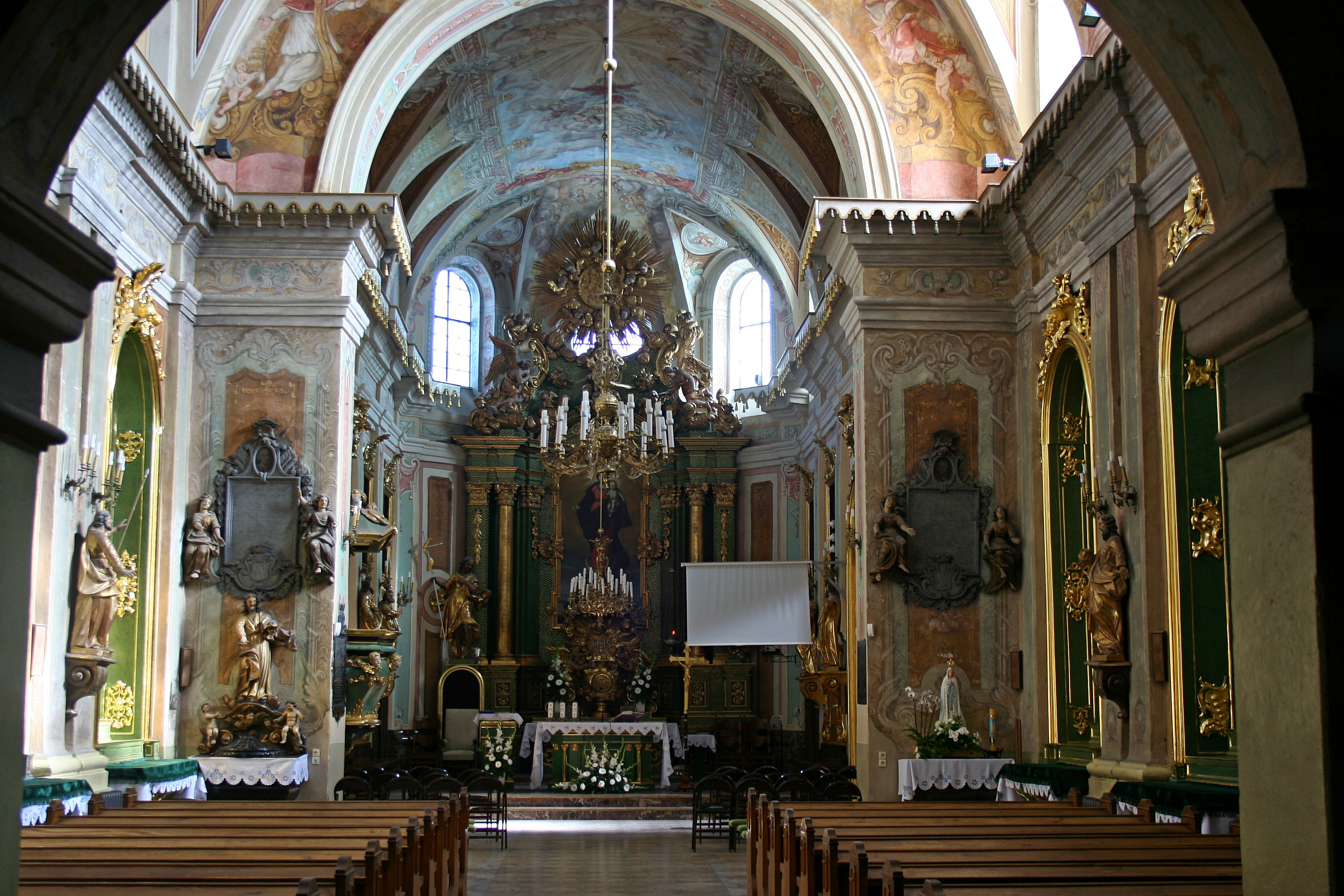
Interior of the Church of the Assumption

The first wooden church in Opole Lubelskie was probably built in the 12th century. In 1368, by decree of King Casimir III the Great, Opole received Środa municipal rights, which was confirmed in documents issued in 1419. In the 16th and 17th centuries, Opole Lubelskie was one of centers of Reformation in Poland. Several Calvinists were active here. In 1625, a hospital was built outside the town, along the road to Sandomierz. Between 1663 and 1675, a new parish church was constructed, which still stands. In the mid 18th century, Opole Lubelskie prospered, after Piarists came here upon request of Jan Tarło, who also rebuilt the Słupecki Palace (now Lubomirski Palace) in the baroque style.

A new hospital and schools were built, the church was expanded and a monastery was opened. In the late 18th century, Rozalia Lubomirska spent a few years in the palace of her husband Aleksander, located in the village of Niezdów, near Opole Lubelskie.

Jews first arrived in the town in the sixteenth century. During the Cossack riots of the seventeenth century, many Jews of Opole were murdered and their property looted. Jews later returned to the town, and in the eighteenth century the town had a synagogue, a cemetery, and an entire Hasidic dynasty. The twentieth century brought change to the community. In addition to the Agudat Israel ultra-orthodox movement and a Beit Ya’akov school for orthodox girls, Zionist groups and secular youth movements, such as Hashomer Hatzair and Beitar, were founded in town. Before the German occupation of World War II, 4,325 Jews lived in Opole Lubelskie, comprising more than two thirds of the population. In September 1939 Opole was occupied by the Germans and the Polish population of the city immediately looted Jewish property.

From the beginning of the war, the Germans brutalized, robbed, and humiliated the Jewish population. On 15 February 1941 and 26 February 1941, two deportation transports with 2,003 Jewish men, women and children on board left Vienna Aspang Station for the ghetto which had been set up in Opole Lubelskie. By March 1941, 8,000 Jews lived in Opole Lubelskie, including the native population, the Austrians, and others from nearby communities such as Kazimierz Dolny and Puławy. Jews from France and Slovakia were also brought here. Crowding in the ghetto was intense with between seven and ten people living in each room. The crowding and lack of indoor plumbing and fresh water led to a typhus epidemic in the winter of 1941 from which hundreds died. From May 1941, men and women capable of work were deployed as forced labourers in Dęblin, Golab, Józefów, and elsewhere. Some worked in the residences, offices, and mess halls of German officials and police.

The German authorities killed several dozen hospital patients in July 1941 and raped and murdered Jewish teenagers in 1942. The mass murder of residents of the ghetto began in the spring of 1942. Hundreds of Jews were brought there and then sent on to killing or labor camps. Transports began in March with one to Belzec extermination camp on 31 March 1942 and deportations to the Sobibor extermination camp followed in May and October 1942. The last transport may have included most local Jews. Women and children rode in horse-drawn carts driven by local farmers; men walked. At Strzelce, a transit camp, they were put on trains to Sobibor where they were immediately murdered. Of the 2,003 Viennese Jews, only twenty-eight are known to have survived. The number of Opole Jews who survived is unknown.

Today Opole Lubelskie is home to one of the most modern prison in Poland - Zakład Karny Opole Lubelskie, which was opened in October 2009.

== Sights ==
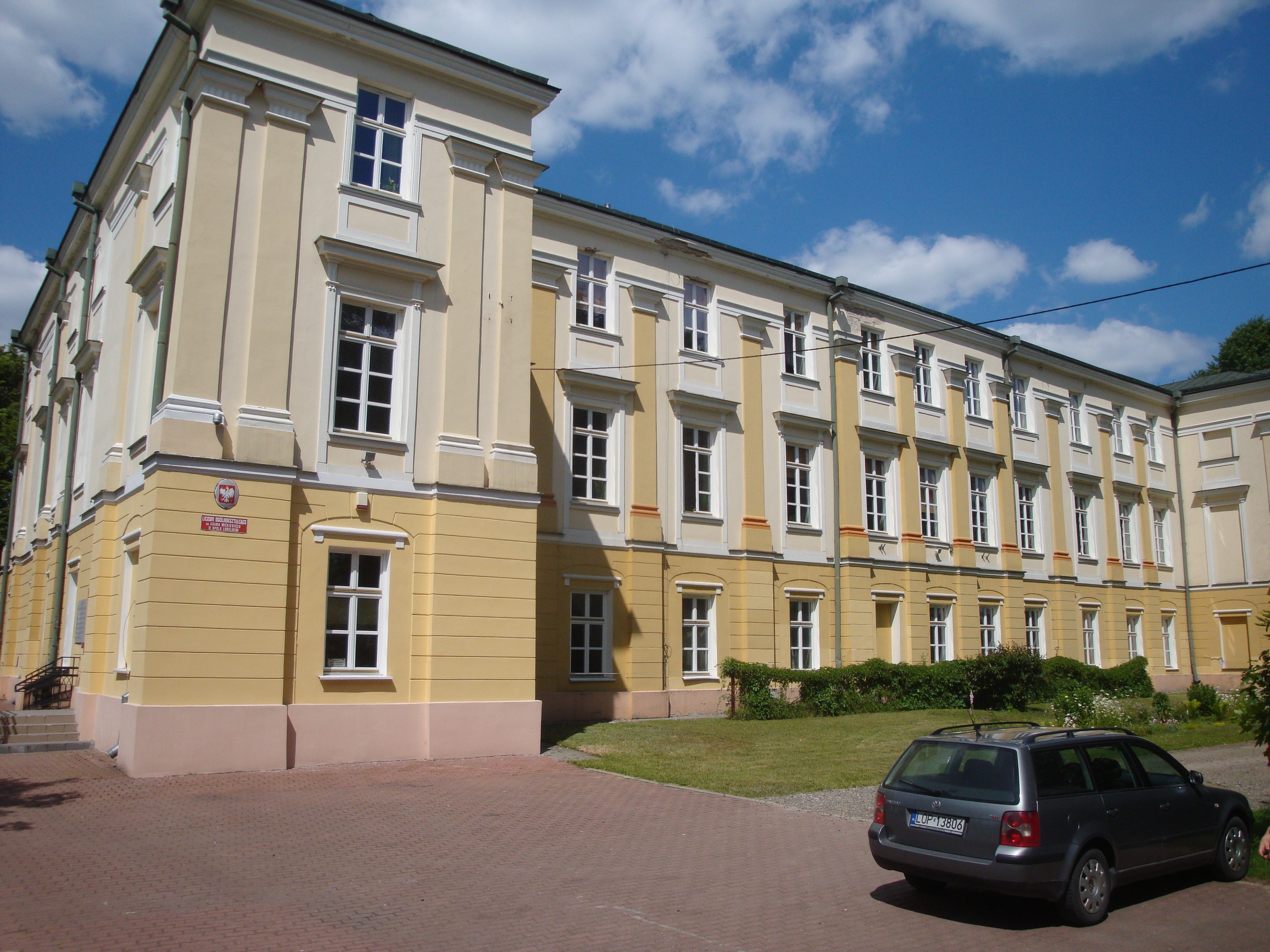
Lubomirski Palace, now Liceum ogólnokształcące im. Adama Mickiewicza, the town's general education liceum

Among points of interest there are the parish Church of Saint Mary (1663-1675, expanded 1748), the complex of the Piarist Monastery, the Lubomirski Palace (today it houses a high school), the town hall (1750), tenement houses and the cemetery chapel (1790). The cemetery itself was opened in 1772.

== Cuisine ==
Among the protected traditional local foods, as designated by the Ministry of Agriculture and Rural Development of Poland, are:

- Wędzone dzwonka karpia z Pustelni, pieces of smoked carp, produced in a traditional way, without artificial preservatives, in the nearby settlement of Pustelnia, a traditional dish of the area.
- Masło z Opola Lubelskiego, local butter.

== Sports ==
The local football club is Opolanin Opole Lubelskie. It competes in the lower leagues.

== Twin towns ==
Opole Lubelskie is twinned with:

- Flobecq, Belgium
- Lyuboml', Ukraine
- San Francisco Libre, Nicaragua
- Sarny, Ukraine
- Sokal, Ukraine
- Târgu Bujor, Romania
- Zhovkva, Ukraine

== See also ==
- UFO-memorial Emilcin in the nearby village of Emilcin
