= Dworki =

Dworki may refer to the following places in Poland:

- Dworki, Lower Silesian Voivodeship (south-west Poland)
- Dworki, Warmian-Masurian Voivodeship (north Poland)
