= Dzikowiec =

Dzikowiec may refer to the following places in Poland:

- Dzikowiec, Lower Silesian Voivodeship (south-west Poland)
- Dzikowiec, Subcarpathian Voivodeship (south-east Poland, formerly Stary Dzikowiec)
