= Włodowice =

Włodowice may refer to the following places in Poland:

- Włodowice, Silesian Voivodeship, town in southern Poland
- Włodowice, Lower Silesian Voivodeship, village in south-western Poland
