= Sokolica =

Sokolica may refer to:

- Sokolica, Lower Silesian Voivodeship (south-west Poland)
- Sokolica, Warmian-Masurian Voivodeship (north Poland)
- Sokolica (Pieniny), peak in Pieniny, mountain range in the south of Poland.
- Sokolica Monastery, a Serbian Orthodox monastery in Kosovo
- Sokolica (mountain), a Mountain in Kosovo

== See also ==
- Sokolitsa
