= Maximilian Seyssel d'Aix =

Bavarian lieutenant general (1776–1855)

Maximilian "Max" Graf Seyssel d'Aix (20 November 1776 – 12 September 1855) was a Bavarian Lieutenant General.

== Birth ==
Seyssel d'Aix was born in Munich as a member of the Seyssel d'Aix family, which moved from the Savoy to Bavaria in the beginning 18th century.

== Early career ==
After joining the army in his youth, he participated in the campaigns at the River Rhine in 1794 and 1795 with the rank of Oberleutnant, and in the war of 1800 as a Rittmeister. Then he served in the campaigns against Austria in 1805 and also against Prussia in 1806/07 with the rank of Major.

Believing that he had rendered outstanding services during the battle at Rothwaltersdorf on 4 June 1807, Seyssel d'Aix requested the bestowal of the Military Order of Max Joseph. However, Lieutenant General Von Deroy argued against Seyssel d'Aix's request, stating that his battle activities were more likely to be punished than awarded, if judged in the court of public opinion.

== Later career ==
Seyssel d'Aix took part in the war of 1812 as an Oberst and commander of the 22nd Light Cavalry Brigade of the Grande Armée. After a short respite at home in the garrison of Augsburg in early 1813, he was returned to the front as commander of a combined Chevau-légers regiment, deployed to Bamberg in 1813. This regiment was subordinated to the "Raglovich" division.

He proved his mettle in the Bautzen, and was awarded with the Knight's Cross of the prestigious (and personally desired) Military Order of Max Joseph for actions taken on 26 May, when he came to the rescue of the "Pacthod" division.

On 17 August 1813, Seyssel d'Aix, another officer, and 40 cavalrymen were captured in the battle at Dornswalde (which is today, a quarter of Baruth/Mark). After Bavaria joined the alliance, he was set free and returned to his regiment. He took part in further campaigns in France and in the Alsace region in 1815.

After serving as divisional commander, he was promoted to Generalkapitän of the Leibgarde der Hartschiere on 13 January 1837. Because he had not requested this promotion, he asked to be retired on several occasions, and his request was finally granted in 1845.

In 1842, prior to his retirement, the important defense barracks of Germersheim fortress was named in his honor.

== Personal life ==
Seyssel d'Aix was married to Princess Sophie of Yrsch-Pienzenau (1805–1872), who was appointed "Pallastdame" (Lady-in-waiting) of the Queen and was honorary dame of the Order of Theresa.

The couple had three sons and two daughters: Edwin (1824–1912), Ludwig (1825–1895), Klothilde (1826–1891), Emma (born 1827) and Camil (1836–1895).

Seyssel d'Aix died on 12 September 1855 in Regensburg. He was 79 years old.

== Awards ==
- Kurfürstliches Kämmerer-Dekret (1799)
- Knights Cross of the Military Order of Max Joseph (Bavaria)
- Chevalier of the Légion d'Honneur (France, 1819), previously appointed Officier (1813)
- Honor Cross of the Royal Bavarian Ludwig Order (1828)
- Commanders Cross of the Royal Merit Order of St Michael (Bavaria, 1838)
- Knight of the Order of the White Eagle (Russia, 1838)
- Grand Cross of the Order of Leopold (Austria, 1844)
