= Stillfried Castle =

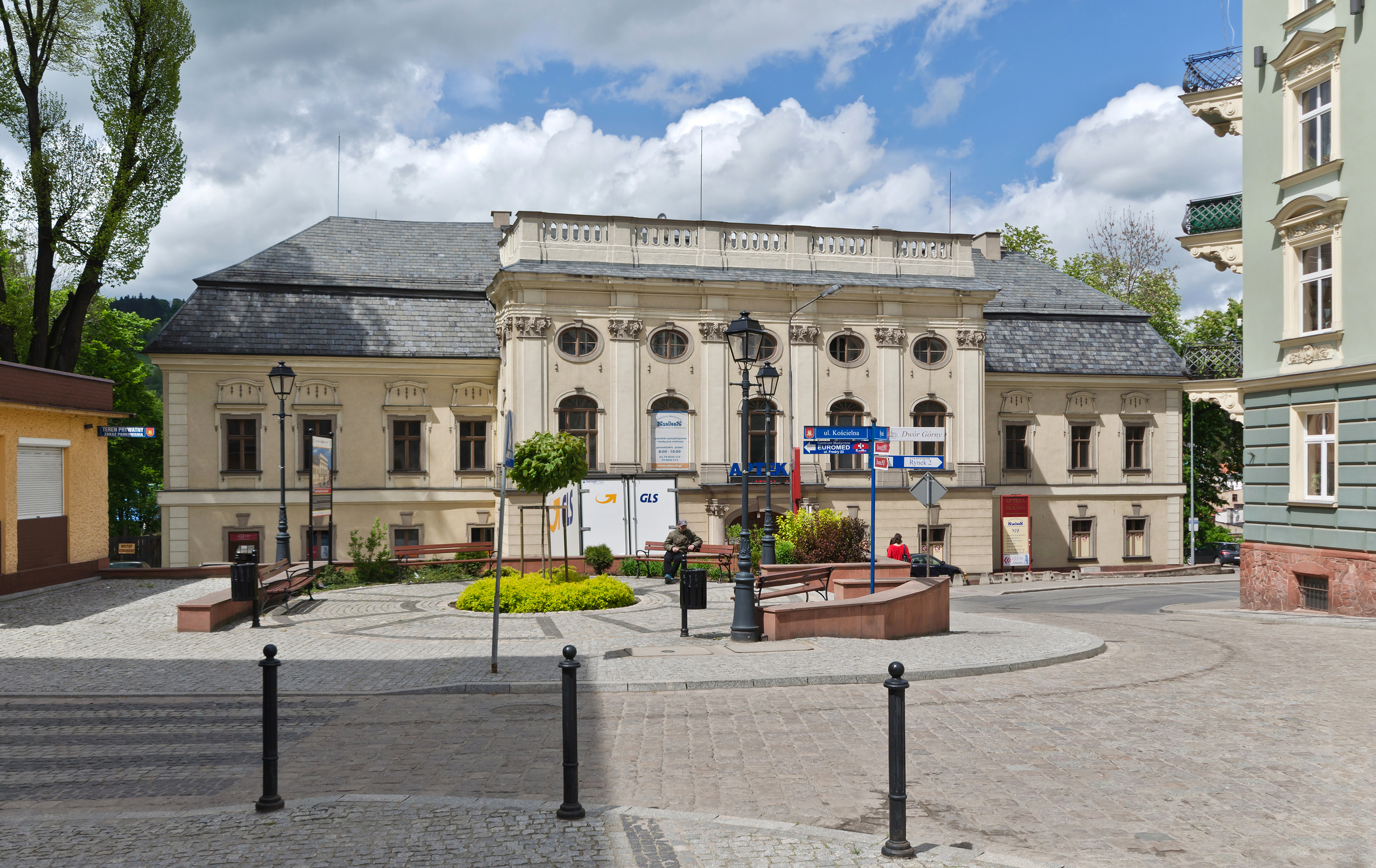
- Stillfried Castle

- Location of the Stillfried Castle in Poland Stillfried Castle (Lower Silesian Voivodeship)
- 50°34′45″N 16°30′05″E
- Location: Nowa Ruda, Lower Silesian Voivodeship, in Poland

History
- Built: 14th century

Site notes
- Architectural style: Baroque

Stillfried Castle (Polish: Zamek Stillfriedów, German: Palais Stillfried) is a historic building in Nowa Ruda, Poland.

== History ==
The original building dates back to the 13th century, when it housed the court of Hannus Wustehube. The earliest record naming the property specifically is from 1352, recording its purchase by Hansel Donyn. Destroyed during the Hussite Wars, it was rebuilt and expanded until being burnt down again during the Thirty Years' War. Under the ownership of the Stillfried family, whose members were barons, the castle was rebuilt and expanded again under the direction of the Italian architect Andrea Carove, taking the form of a large square around a courtyard with a tower at its centre. The tower was pulled down in 1730, and the building's last major expansion took place in 1796, when it was given its present baroque facade.

In 1810, the Stillfried family moved to a palace in Bożków, and Stillfried castle from that point was used for the administration of the nearby mines and properties of the family. From 1901, the castle held various state institutions, including the health authority, briefly, in 1945. Most of the original interior has been replaced, but a grand two-speed staircase remains in place.

The castle has been in private hands since 2004.
