= Jugowska Pass =

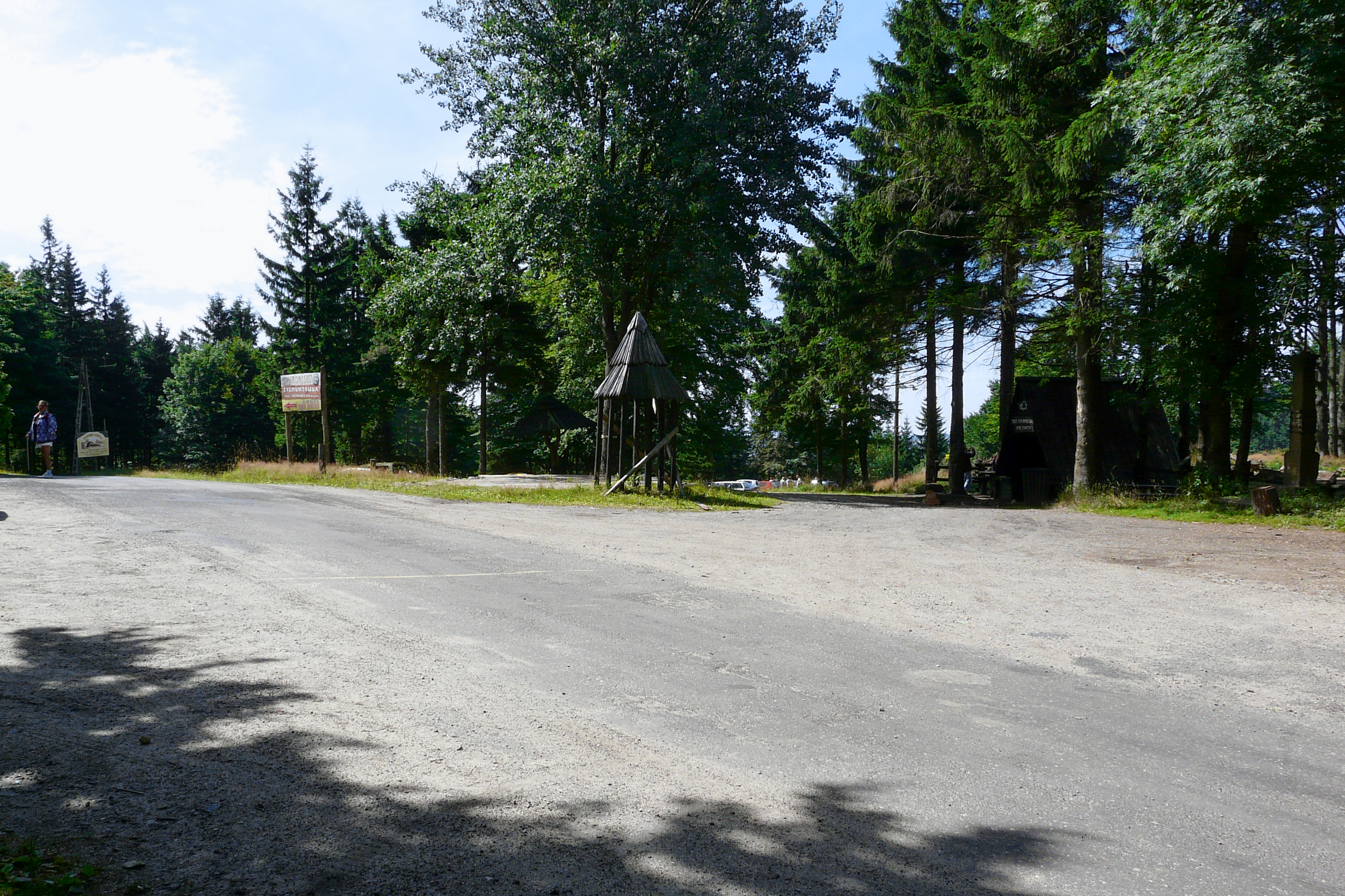
- View on the Jugowska Pass
- Interactive map of Jugowska Pass
- Elevation: 2,627.95 feet (801.00 m)

Third Approach
- Location: Lower Silesia, Poland
- Range: Góry Sowie
- Coordinates: 50°39′23″N 16°31′34″E

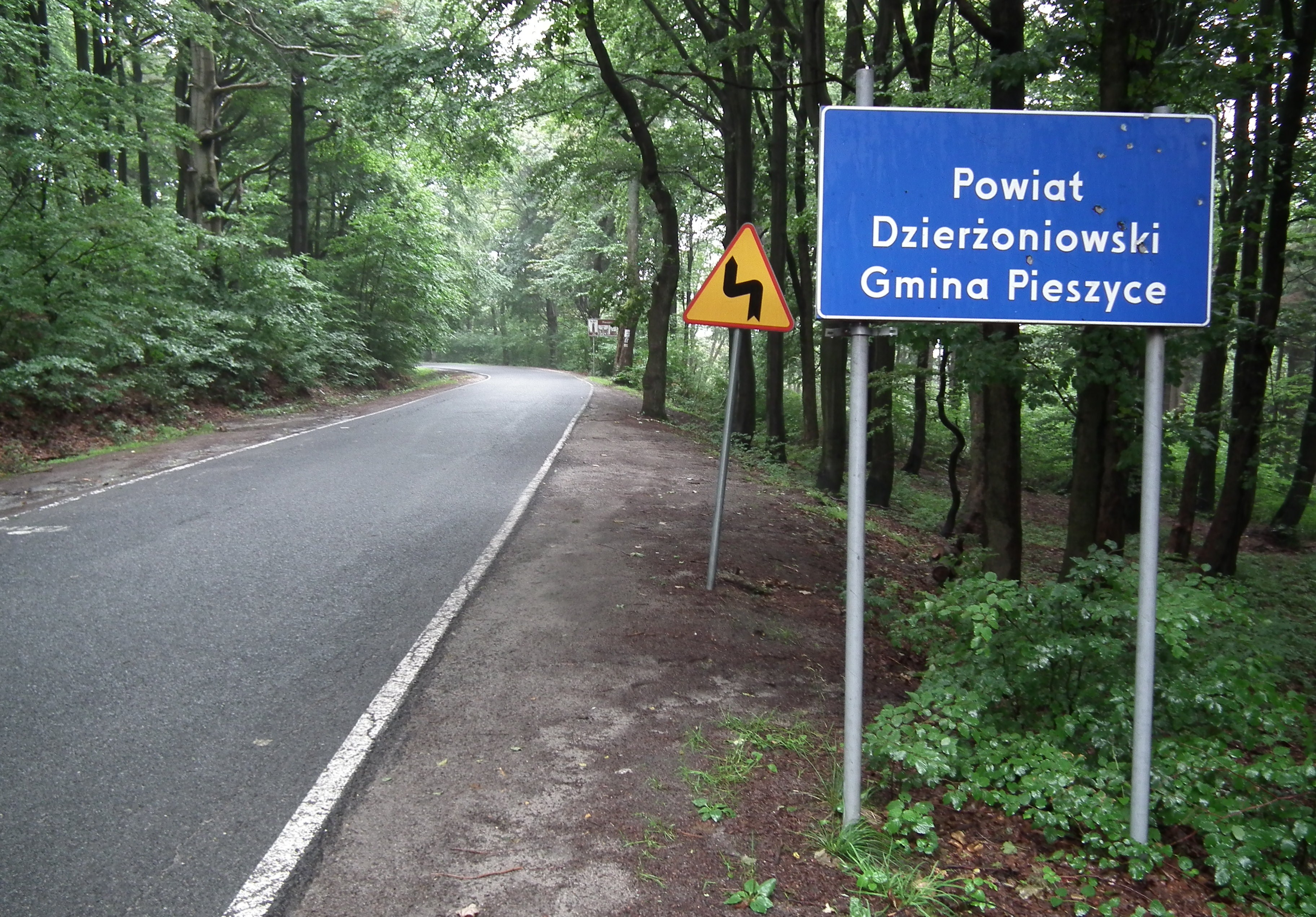
Exit towards Pieszyce

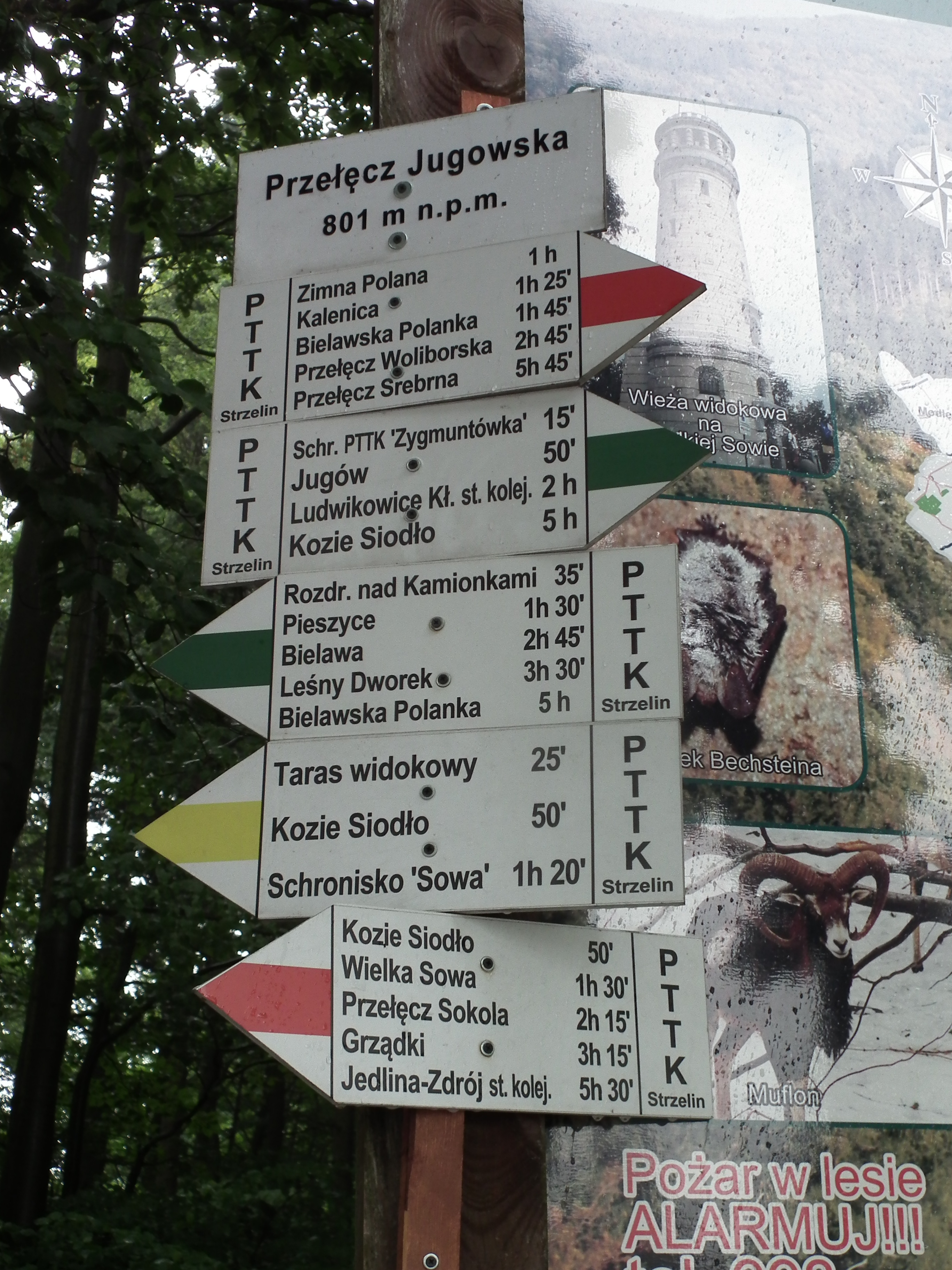
The junction of tourist routes

Jugowska Pass (Polish: Przełęcz Jugowska; German: Hausdorfer Kreuz, Hausdorfer Plänel, Kreuzplänel) is a mountain pass, located at 805 m above sea level in south-western Poland in the Central Sudetes, Sowie Mountains.

== Localization ==
The pass is located in the central part of the Sowie Mountains, north of the town of Jugów.

== Characteristics ==
The pass is a vast saddle, located at an altitude of 801 m, clearly marked in the terrain with asymmetrical slopes and approaches, deeply cut into the ground between, the saddle Rymarz (913 m above sea level) on the south-eastern side and Kozia Równina (930 m above sea level) on the west-north side. The closest surroundings of the pass from the west side is occupied by a large meadow "Jugowska Polana", which is a vantage point with a panorama of the Sowie Mountains, Wzgórza Wyrębińskie and Wzgórza Włodzickie, the other surroundings are overgrown with spruce and beech and spruce and beech forest. Through the pass leads the road among Nowa Ruda and Dzierżoniów, and Pieszyce.

== History ==
Through the pass, as early as in the 17th century, there was a road leading from Nowa Ruda and Jugów to storage places on the northern side of the Sowie Mountains. Count the nineteenth century, which is a component, at the beginning built in a new road, a maopa other than the expensive road. Since then, the popularity among tourists has been breaking, causing the surrounding areas to be suitable for winter sports. The shelter from before 1945 already operates the Zygmuntówka hostel (formerly Henkelbaude) and the "Bukowa Chata" guesthouse that has been operating since recently. In the past in the nearest breakthrough. Built in 1928. In the building of the former inn. It owed its name to an iron cross, erected in 1885. In a wooden place. Kreuzbaude was a one-storey building with an attic, covered with a gable roof with an observation veranda. In the high foundation, 4 garages for cars were appointed. Its main hotel equipment, but also had 8 beds. Devastated after the Second World War, first completely dismantled.

== Others ==
- The Jugowska Pass is one of the most visited places in the Sowie Mountains.
- The slopes around the pass are excellent hillsides (a good place for skiing).
- The Jugowska Pass is a habit and a tourist trail.

== Tourism ==
The tourist routes that go through the Jugowska Pass are:

- Szlak czerwony – fragment of the trail leading from Wielka Sowa through Kalenica to Srebrna Góra and beyond.
- Szlak zielony – a part of the trail leading from Ludwikowice Kłodzkie to Kamionki.
- Szlak żółty - Jugowska Pass - viewing platform at the Kozia Równia - Kozie Siodło Pass - Sowa hostel.

== Bibliography ==
- Słownik geografii turystycznej Sudetów. Marek Staffa (redakcja). T. 11: Góry Sowie, Wzgórza Włodzickie. Wrocław: Wyd: I-Bis 1995, ISBN 83-85773-12-6.
- Przewodnik "Góry Sowie" red.W.Brygier, T.Śnieżek Wyd. "PLAN" Jelenia Góra, ISBN 978-83-61942-14-6
- Mapa "Góry Sowie" skala 1:35 000 Wyd.Plan J.Góra 2006 r., ISBN 83-60044-19-8
