= Franz Xaver Gebauer =

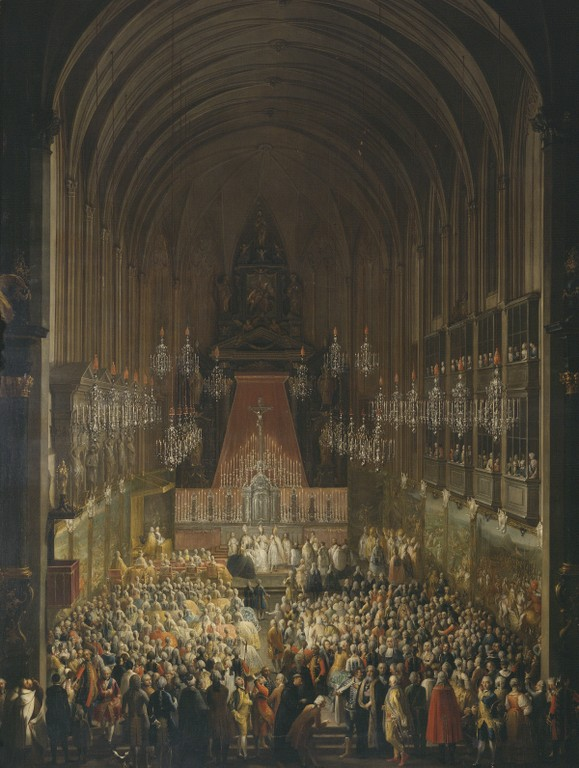
F. X. Gebauer became music director in 1816 of the Augustinian Church, Vienna; shown is the wedding of Emperor Joseph II and Princess Isabella of Parma in 1760, by Martin van Meytens

Franz Xaver Gebauer (c.1784 – 13 December 1822), born in Prussian Silesia, was an organist, composer of church music, and choirmaster and music director of the Augustinian Church, Vienna. Before his early death he organised the 'Concerts Spirituels' which promoted German music in Vienna at a time when Italian opera was particularly popular.

== Life ==
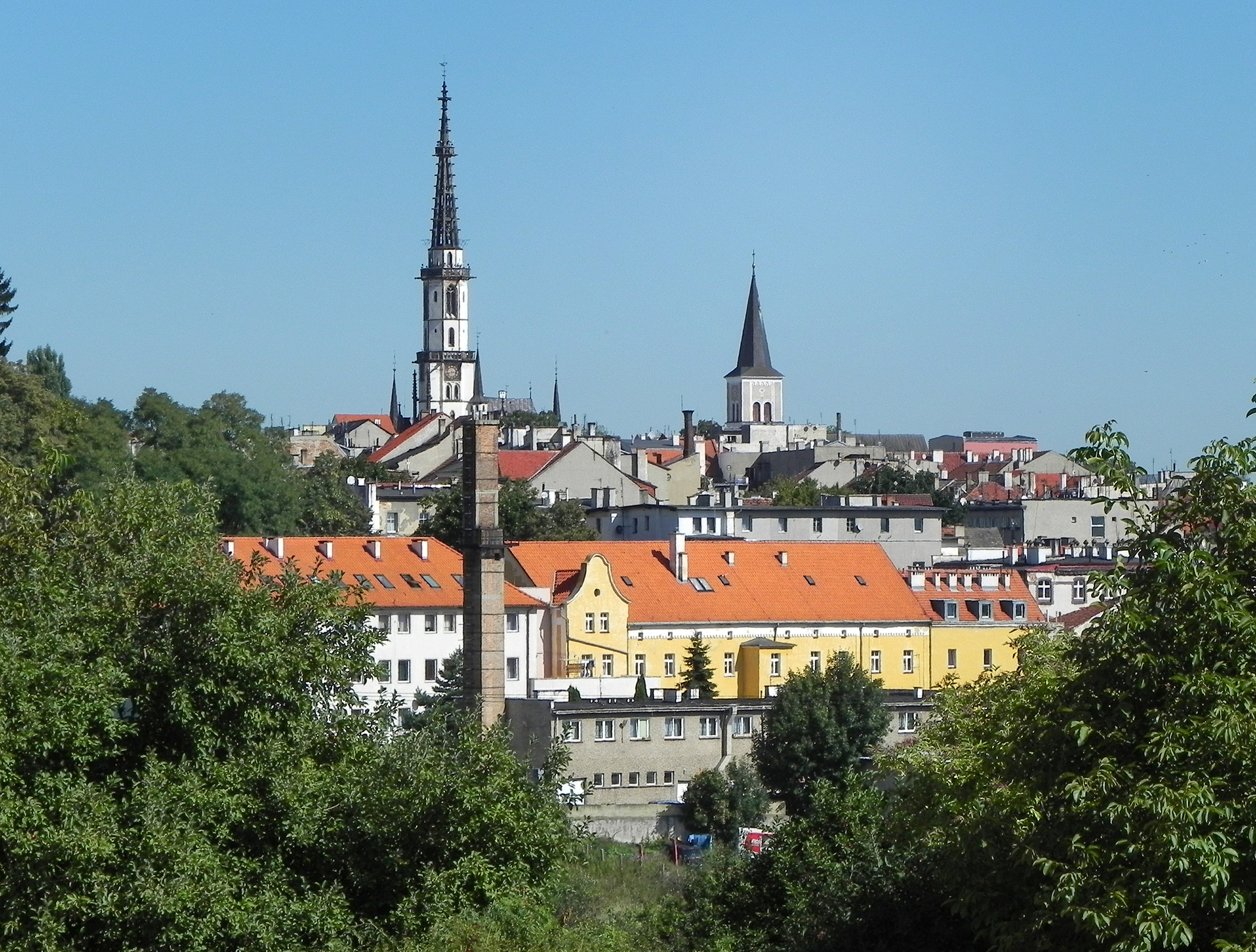
Gebauer was organist in Franckstein (Ząbkowice Śląskie)

Franz Xaver Gebauer was born in Eckersdorf, County of Glatz, Kingdom of Prussia (now Bożków, Kłodzko County, Lower Silesian Voivodeship, Poland. (Note: Bożków was located in the lands of the Count of Glatz (now County of Kladsko), which until 1742 was a suzerain polity within the Habsburg-ruled Kingdom of Bohemia; Empress Maria Teresa lost the territory to an invading Prussian army, and Glatz was formally annexed by the Treaty of Breslau. See also Lands of the Bohemian Crown.) He was the son of a teacher and organist who gave him his first music lessons. After further training in Breslau (now Wrocław) - about 90 km (56 miles) north of Glatz - he worked first as an organist in Franckstein in Silesia. (Note: An 18th century map of Glatz County shows Glatz (Kladsko) in the centre, Eckersdorf to the NW just in the NeuRoda district, and Franckstein to the NE, just by the title cartouche.) In 1810 he went to Vienna, where he soon became known for his performances on the "mouth harp" (i.e. Jew's harp). In addition, he played the cello and gave music lessons.

In 1816 he was engaged as choral conductor and music director at the Augustinian Church, Vienna (the 'Hofpfarr Kirche' or Court parish church). He was a founding member in 1812 of the Vienna Gesellschaft der Musikfreunde until its dissolution in 1848.

F. X. Gebauer "held intercourse with Beethoven in a free and easy way without ever exciting the composer's anger." Beethoven punningly refers to him as the "Geh' Bauer" ("Go, peasant') in a letter.

== 'Concerts spirituels' ==
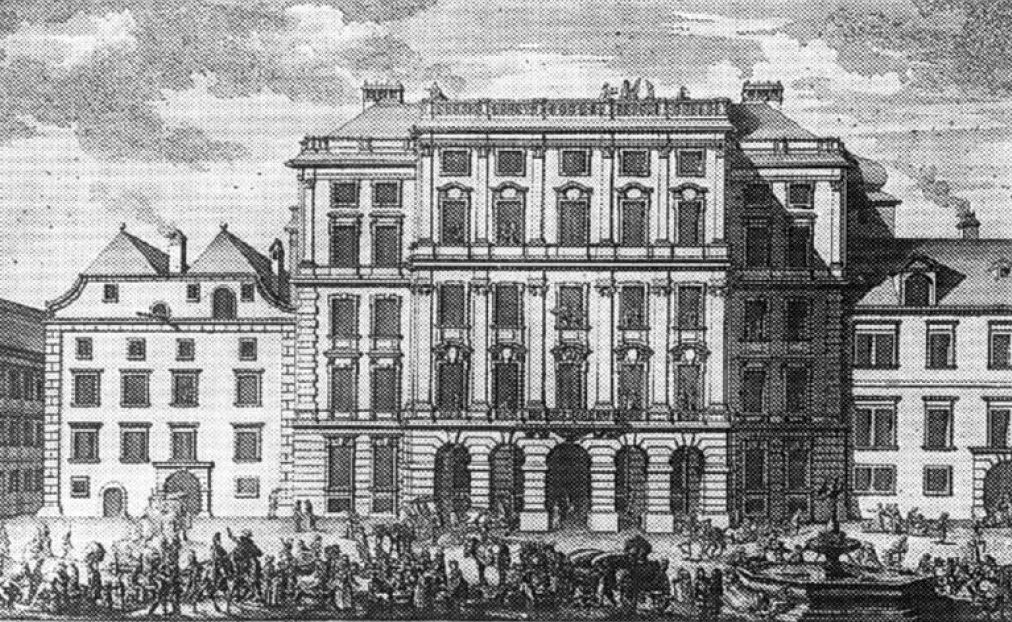
The 'Mehlgrube', New Market, Vienna, in 1715

Together with his friend Ferdinand Piringer he founded in 1819 the "Concerts spirituels" in the Mehlgrube in the Neuer Markt, Wien. These were concert seasons which promoted music by German-speaking composers, in competition against the then current craze for Rossini. The concerts began before the Italian season in March, with which even Piringer was taken: in a letter to Beethoven he wrote, "To-day is the saddest in the Viennese calendar, for yesterday was the last of the Italian opera." (Note: The last sentence in Piringer's letter refers to the enthusiasm created by Rossini's operas. Schindler has much to say about it: in the year 1823, he remarks, "the little respect left for German vocal music had vanished." Piringer is often mentioned in the Conversation Books. Beethoven's Letters etc.)

Beethoven's music figured prominently: during the first two seasons of the 'Concerts Spirituels' of 1820–21 and 1821–22 his eight completed symphonies were performed (the 9th was finished in 1824); Leopoldine Blahetka, aged about 11, played the B flat Concerto on 3 April 1820; and the cantatas Meeresstille und glückliche Fahrt and Christ on the Mount of Olives, as well as the Mass in C were given. The choir was thought to be much better than the orchestra; the first concerts seem to have been little more than 'run-throughs' with a band of dedicated amateurs ('dilettanti') scraping their way at sight through the works of Beethoven, who referred to the concerts in his conversation books.

Gebauer wrote a number of songs, which were published; other some compositions of e.g. sacred music remained in MS.

== Death ==
Franz Xaver Gebauer died in Vienna at half past midnight on 13 December 1822 of a haemorrhage of the lungs, in his 38th year. The effort of an unaccustomed mountain climb and the rigorous climate on his last trip to Switzerland may have contributed to his early death. Mozart's Requiem, which he venerated highly, was performed in his honour by the choir he founded under Ferdinand Piringer.

Piringer took over the 'Concerts spirituels' along with Karl Holz (violinist in the Schuppanzigh Quartet) and the tenor Ludwig Titze, with Eduard Lannoy as conductor.
