= Ludwig Titze =

Austrian singer (1797–1850)

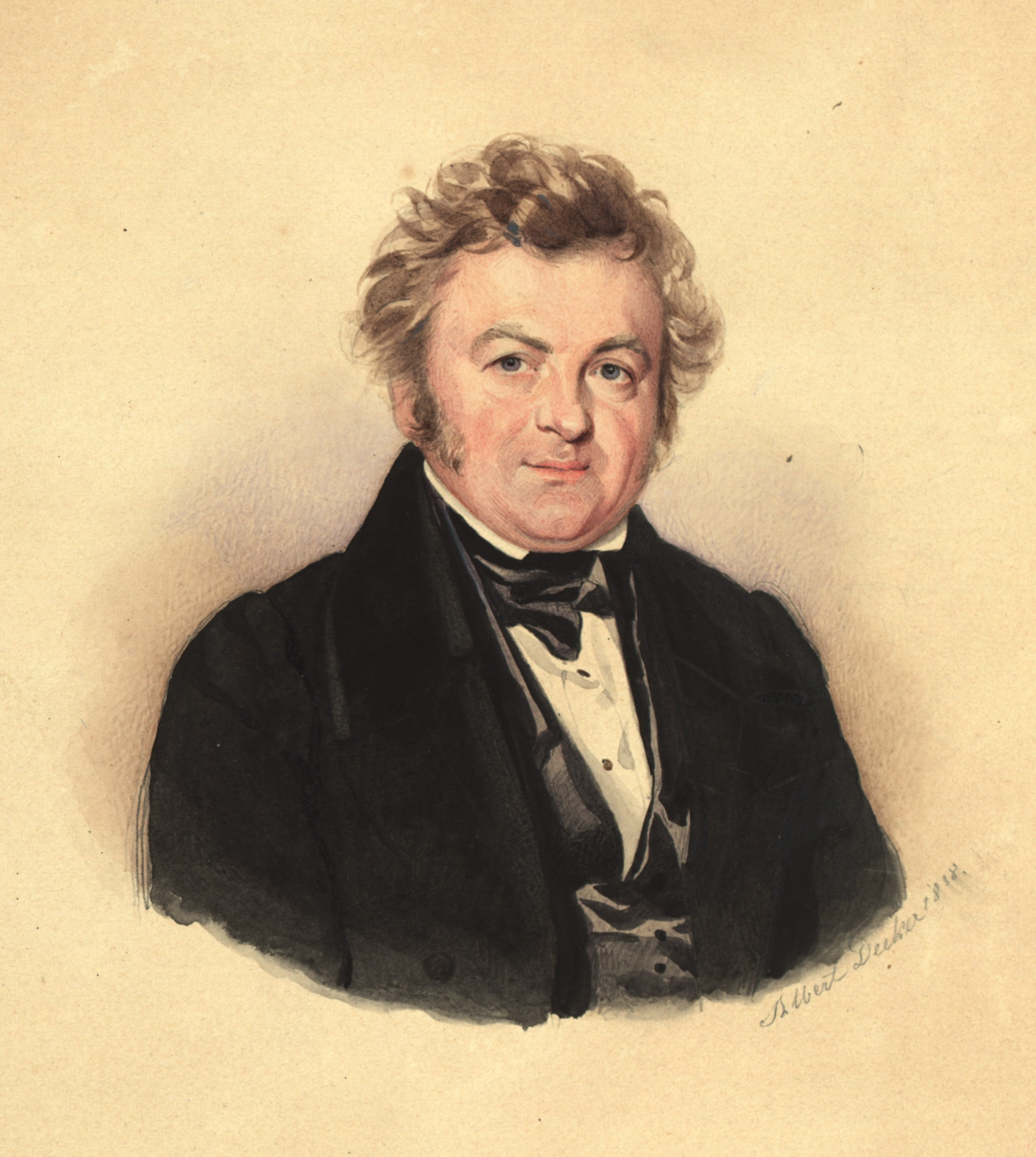
Portrait of Titze by Albert Decker, 1838

Ludwig Titze or Tietze (1 April 1797 – 11 January 1850) was a singer who gave a number of first public performances of Franz Schubert's songs and other vocal works. He was a member of the Imperial chapel ('Hofkapelle'), Vienna, and of the Tonkünstler-Societät, and vice-Pedell of the University of Vienna.

He was born in Braunau, Bohemia (now Broumov, Czech Republic).

Possessor of a sympathetic and highly trained tenor voice, with a very pure style of execution, Titze was universally popular. He sang at the 'Concerts Spirituels' founded in 1821 by Franz Xaver Gebauer, and after Gebauer's early death in 1823 acted as choir-master, Karl Holz being leader, and Baron Eduard Lannoy conductor. Between 1822 and 1839 he appeared at 26 concerts of the Tonkünstler-Societät, singing the tenor solos in such works as Handel's Solomon, Athalia, Jephtha and Messiah, and Joseph Haydn's The Creation and The Seasons, associated in the latter with Josef Staudigl after 1833.

From 1822 he also sang at innumerable concerts and soirées of the Gesellschaft der Musikfreunde. His special claim to distinction, however, was his production of Schubert's songs at these soirées. He sang successively, Rastlose Liebe (29 January 1824, and 1831); Erlkönig (1825); Der Einsame (1826); Nachthelle (1827); Norman's Gesang (March 8, 1827, accompanied by Schubert on the piano, and 1839); Gute Nacht (1828); Der blinde Knabe, and Drang in die Ferne (1829); Liebesbotschaft and Auf dem Strome (1832); An mein Herz Sehnsucht and Die Sterne (1833); besides taking his part in the quartets Geist der Liebe (1823 and 32); Die Nachtigall (1824); Der Gondelfahrer (1825); and the solo in the Song of Miriam (1832).

At the single concert given by Schubert, March 26, 1828, he sang Auf dem Strome accompanied on the French horn by Josef Rudolf Lewy and on the piano by Schubert. These lists show that Schubert's works were not entirely neglected in Vienna during the composer's lifetime. His name appears in the programmes of the Gesellschaft soirées 88 times between 1821 and 1840.

Titze is mentioned in an anecdote about the creation of Schubert's song "Hark, hark! the lark".

He died in Vienna.
