= Gmina Nowa Ruda =

Gmina Nowa Ruda Nowa Ruda Commune
- Gmina
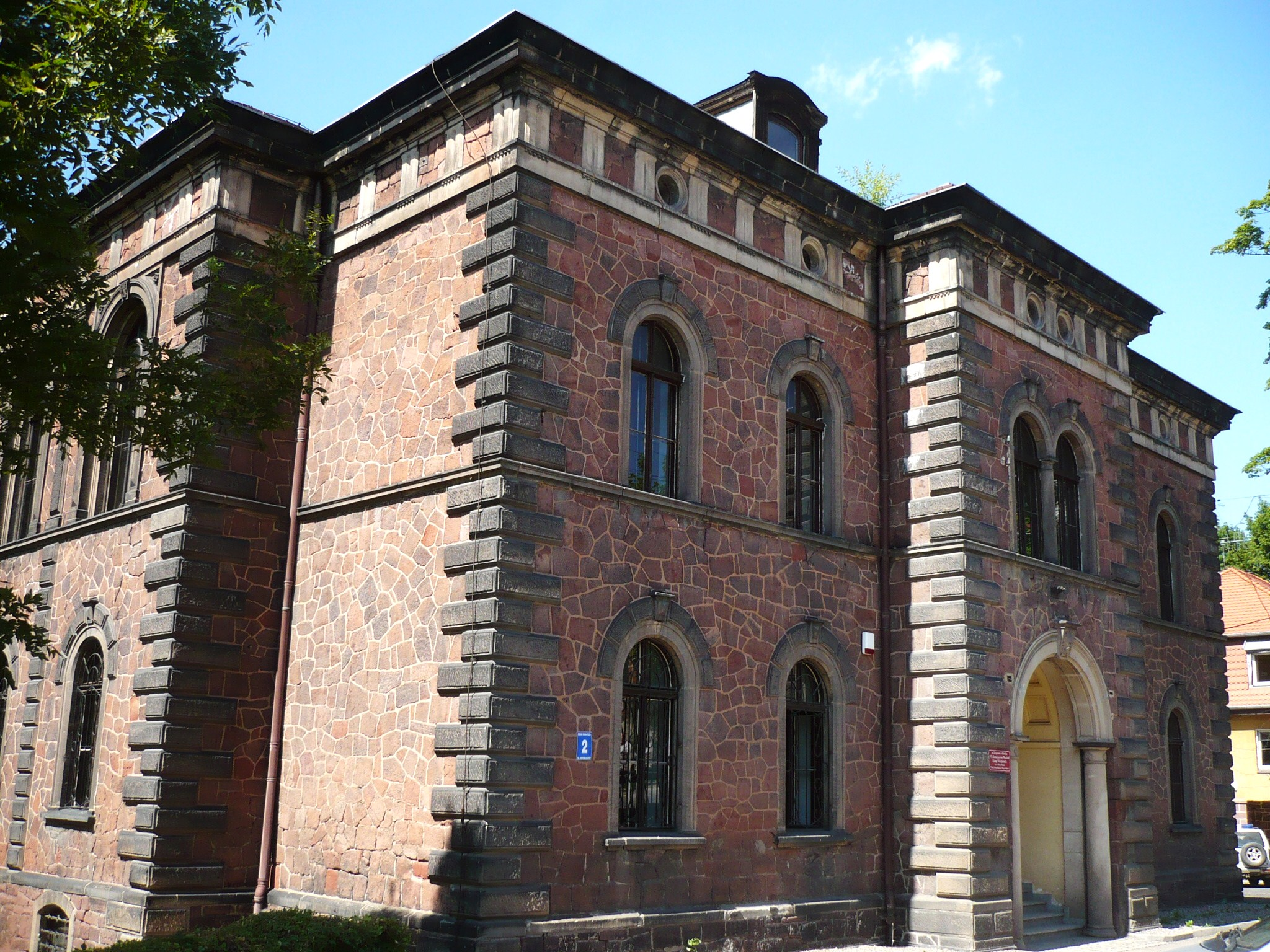
- Gmina office in Nowa Ruda

- Flag Coat of arms
- Interactive map of Gmina Nowa Ruda
- Coordinates (Nowa Ruda): 50°35′N 16°30′E
- Country: Poland
- Voivodeship: Lower Silesian
- County: Kłodzko
- Seat: Nowa Ruda
- Sołectwos (Incorporated villages): Bartnica, Bieganów, Bożków, Czerwieńczyce, Dworki, Dzikowiec, Jugów, Krajanów, Ludwikowice Kłodzkie, Nowa Wieś Kłodzka, Przygórze, Sokolec, Sokolica, Świerki, Włodowice, Wolibórz

Area
  - Total: 139.66 km^{2} (53.92 sq mi)

Population (2019-06-30)
  - Total: 11,599
  - Density: 83.052/km^{2} (215.10/sq mi)
- Time zone: UTC+1 (CET)
  - Summer (DST): UTC+2 (CEST)
- Vehicle registration: DKL
- Website: http://gmina.nowaruda.pl/

Gmina Nowa Ruda is a rural gmina (administrative district) in Kłodzko County, Lower Silesian Voivodeship, in south-western Poland. Its seat is the town of Nowa Ruda, although the town is not part of the territory of the gmina.

The gmina covers an area of 139.66 square kilometres (53.9 sq mi), and as of 2019 its total population is 11,599.

== Neighbouring gminas ==
Gmina Nowa Ruda is bordered by the towns of Bielawa, Nowa Ruda and Pieszyce, and the gminas of Dzierżoniów, Głuszyca, Kłodzko, Radków, Stoszowice and Walim. It also borders the Czech Republic.

== Villages ==
The gmina contains the villages of Bartnica, Bieganów, Bożków, Czerwieńczyce, Dworki, Dzikowiec, Jugów, Krajanów, Ludwikowice Kłodzkie, Nowa Wieś Kłodzka, Przygórze, Sokolec, Sokolica, Świerki, Włodowice and Wolibórz.

== Literary Heights Festival ==
The Literary Heights Festival, a Polish literary festival founded in 2015 which takes place in the vicinity of Nowa Ruda at the foot of the Owl Mountains in the Kłodzko Valley.

The event's organizers include the Mount Babel Cultural Association, the city and commune of Nowa Ruda, while the hosts are Karol Maliszewski and Olga Tokarczuk. The festival's program includes educational sessions, debates, concerts, panels, shows, meetings, poetry, literary workshops, film screenings, culinary workshops and various exhibitions.

== Twin towns – sister cities ==
Gmina Nowa Ruda is twinned with:

- Bruay-sur-l'Escaut, France
- Giżycko, Poland
- Hronov, Czech Republic
- Somonino, Poland
