= Sokolec, Lower Silesian Voivodeship =

Sokolec
- Village
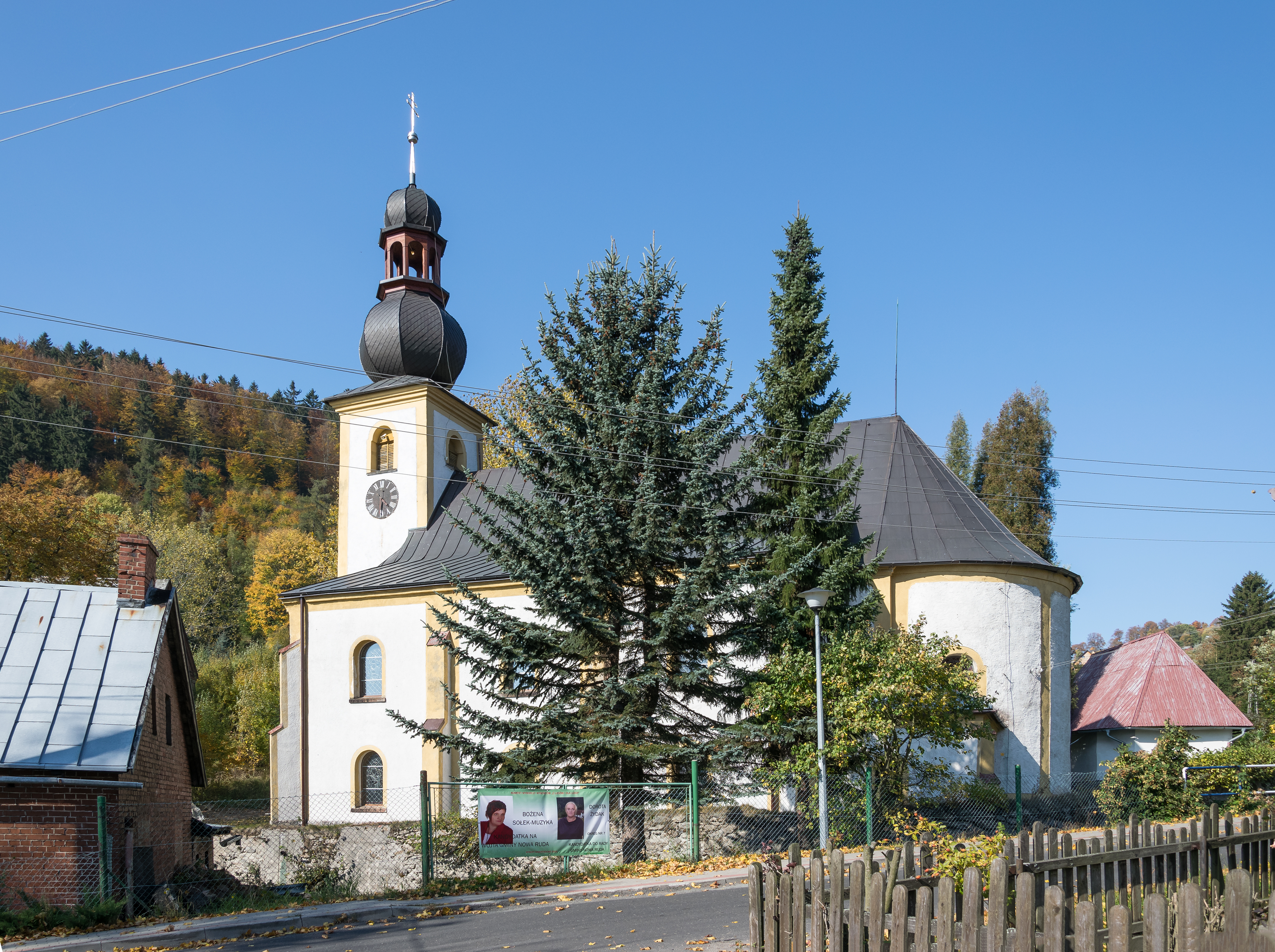
- Saint Martin Church

- Location within Poland
- Coordinates: 50°39′11″N 16°28′19″E
- Country: Poland
- Voivodeship: Lower Silesian
- County: Kłodzko
- Gmina: Nowa Ruda

Population
  - Total: 230

Sokolec [sɔˈkɔlɛt͡s] is a village in the administrative district of Gmina Nowa Ruda, within Kłodzko County, Lower Silesian Voivodeship, in south-western Poland.
