= Heinrich Feisthauer =

Heinrich Feisthauer (14 September 1898 – 11 November 1964) was an opponent of the Nazi regime and survivor of Sachsenhausen concentration camp of Silesian origin.

== Early life ==
Feisthauer's ancestors were Austrian Landler who were deported from Maria Theresa because of their Protestant beliefs. Feisthauer was born on 14 September 1898 in Eckersdorf (now Bożków in Poland) in Grafschaft Glatz, Silesia. He was the son of a mounted policeman. Feisthauer wanted to become a watchmaker. However, his mother wanted him to be a gardener, so he started training for this profession which he later cancelled. He subsequently worked as an agent for margarine and chocolate until 1938. The goods were stored in the basement. He drove his deliveries with a baker's bike to his customers. He married and had three children.

== Prisoner in Sachsenhausen concentration camp ==
Feisthauer lost his job in 1938 because of his lack of Nazi membership. He lost his concession for the foods business. He was instructed to collect donations for the Nazi Party but refused. On 23 June he was brought to Sachsenhausen concentration camp as part of the Aktion Arbeitsscheu Reich. He remained there until 1 February 1939. His prisoner number was 005680, he was placed in block 22. In the concentration camp he was tortured, inter alia, Chinese water torture. He was taken to the concentration camp with two other men, one of whom did not return. Feisthauer was a wrecked man when he returned to Eckersdorf. He was so pale and skinny that his family did not recognize him in the first moments. They wanted to send "the strange man" away when they saw him that first time.

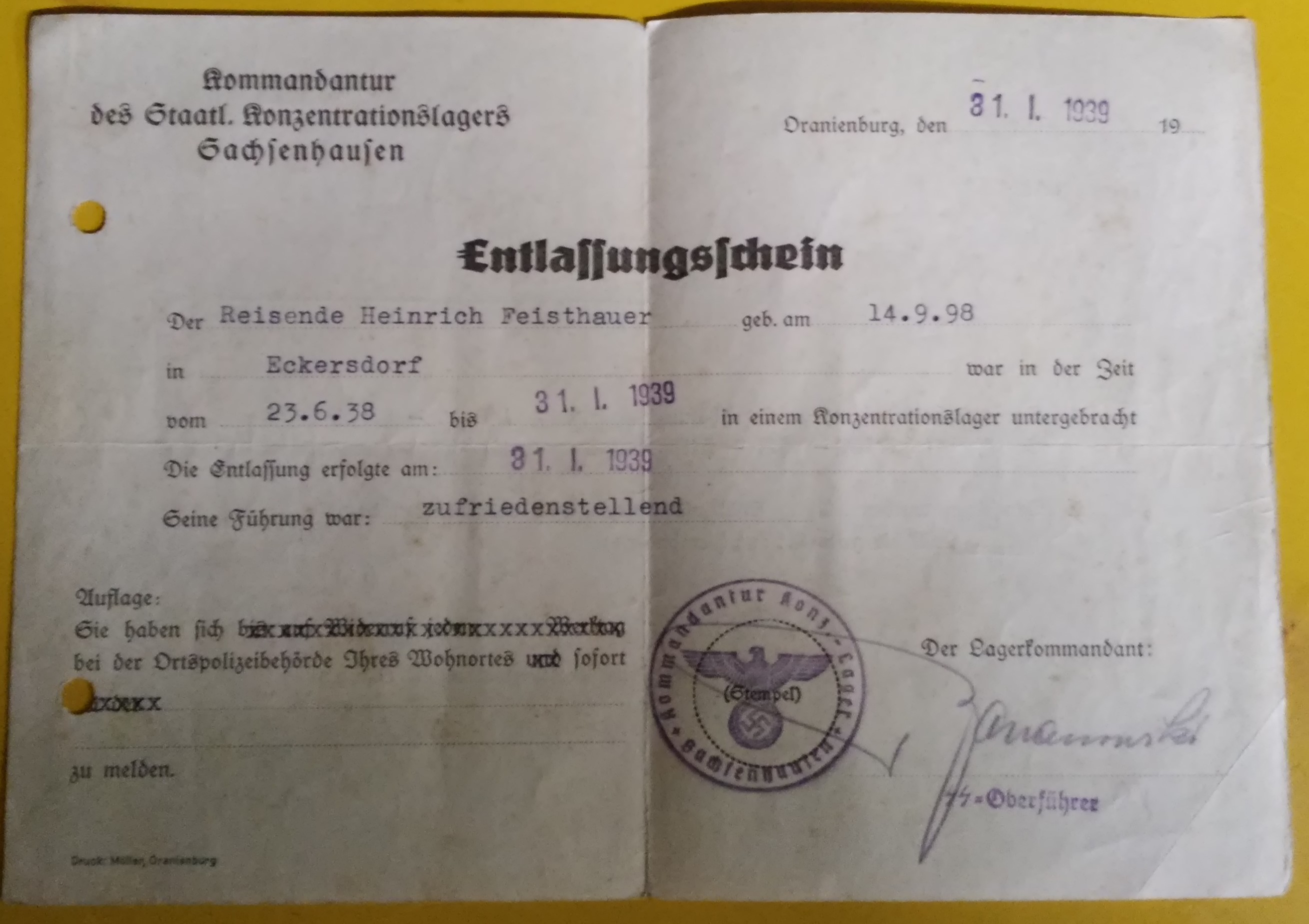
Permission to leave the Concentration camp. The permission to leave consists of a grade concerning the behavior of Feisthauer, Feisthauer was graded as satisfying

== Life after Sachsenhausen ==
Feisthauer never recovered from his experience at Sachsenhausen. He was never able to again work after release from the camp. After the expulsion of ethnic Germans from Silesia in 1946, he arrived in Esperke, Lower Saxony. A war refugee commission was formed in Esperke on 04/06/1946. Feisthauer was a member of this commission. Feisthauer was a member of the Union of Persecutees of the Nazi Regime. He died in Esperke on November 11, 1964.
