= Bieganów, Lower Silesian Voivodeship =

Bieganów
- Village
- Location within Poland
- Coordinates: 50°33′32″N 16°30′06″E
- Country: Poland
- Voivodeship: Lower Silesian
- County: Kłodzko
- Gmina: Nowa Ruda

Bieganów [bjɛˈɡanuf] is a village in the administrative district of Gmina Nowa Ruda, within Kłodzko County, Lower Silesian Voivodeship, in south-western Poland.
