= Wolibórz =

- Village
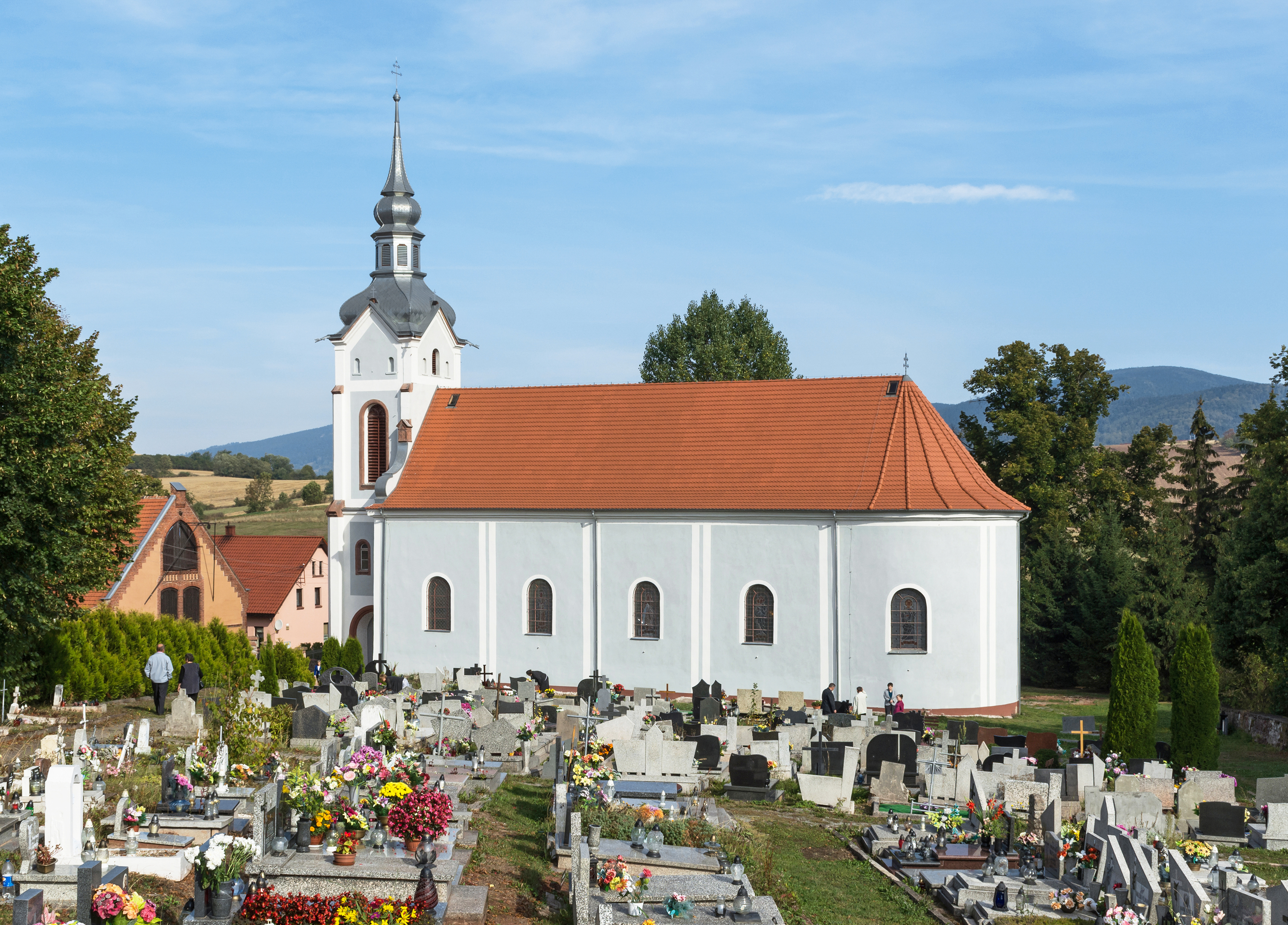
- Church of the Saint Jacob, the Apostle

- Location within Poland
- Coordinates: 50°36′N 16°34′E
- Country: Poland
- Voivodeship: Lower Silesian
- County: Kłodzko
- Gmina: Nowa Ruda
- Elevation: 480 m (1,570 ft)

Population (approx.)
  - Total: 1,300

Wolibórz [vɔˈlibuʂ] is a village in the administrative district of Gmina Nowa Ruda, within Kłodzko County, Lower Silesian Voivodeship, in south-western Poland.

== Notable residents ==
- Hans Bütow (1894-1974), German admiral
