= Eduard de Lannoy =

Flemish composer, teacher, conductor, and writer

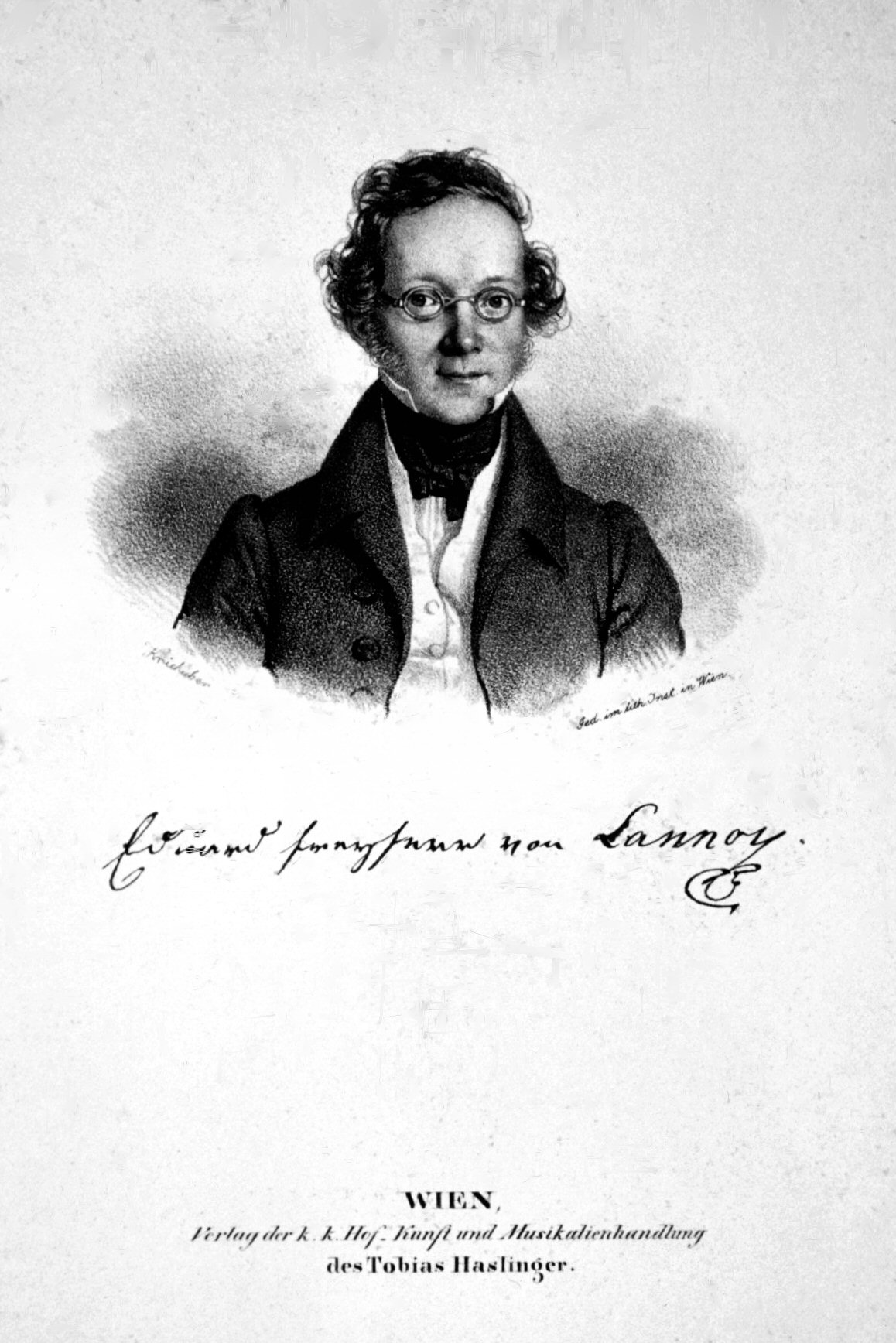
Eduard von Lannoy (1837 lithograph by Josef Kriehuber)

Baron Henri Eduard Joseph de Lannoy (3 December 1787 – 28 March 1853), was a Flemish composer, teacher, conductor, and writer on music who spent most of his life in Austria. His compositions bridge the classical and early romantic styles. His full name and title in German was 'Heinrich Eduard Josef, Freiherr von Lannoy'.

== Biography ==
Political background

The turbulent political events from 1789 include the Belgian Revolution and the French Revolution; during the subsequent French Revolutionary Wars, French troops under Napoléon Bonaparte pushed the armies of the First Coalition as far as the Rhine, and in 1795 the Republic of France formally annexed the Southern Netherlands (now Belgium. See Map of Europe in 1812.) A number of government officials left the country, including Lannoy's father and Jean Vesque de Puttelange; they both eventually obtained official government positions in Vienna, where their sons had fruitful musical careers.

=== Early life ===
Eduard de Lannoy was born in Brussels, then in the Duchy of Brabant, a region of the Austrian Netherlands, part of the Holy Roman Empire. His father was Pierre Joseph Albert, baron de Lannoy (1733–1825), of the Lannoy family, one of the oldest families in Belgium. (Note: See also Chronological list of Belgian families) His father's career began in 1756 in the Finance department of the Austro-Belgian government; after the suppression of the Jesuit order in 1773 he was chief administrator for the disbursement of its estates. He received the Knight's Cross of the Order of St. Stephen and was made a Freiherr (Baron) in 1809. He died in Wildhaus (see below), 8 February 1825.

Lannoy, aged about 8, came with his parents to the Austrian Duchy of Styria in 1796. He attended school and the 'Gymnasium' in Graz from 1796 to 1801. He returned to Brussels and enrolled at the École centrale de Bruxelles (previously the Old University of Leuven), where he studied linguistics, philosophy and jurisprudence, and especially mathematics and music. A shared prize-winning cantata of his was performed in 1806.

=== Later life ===
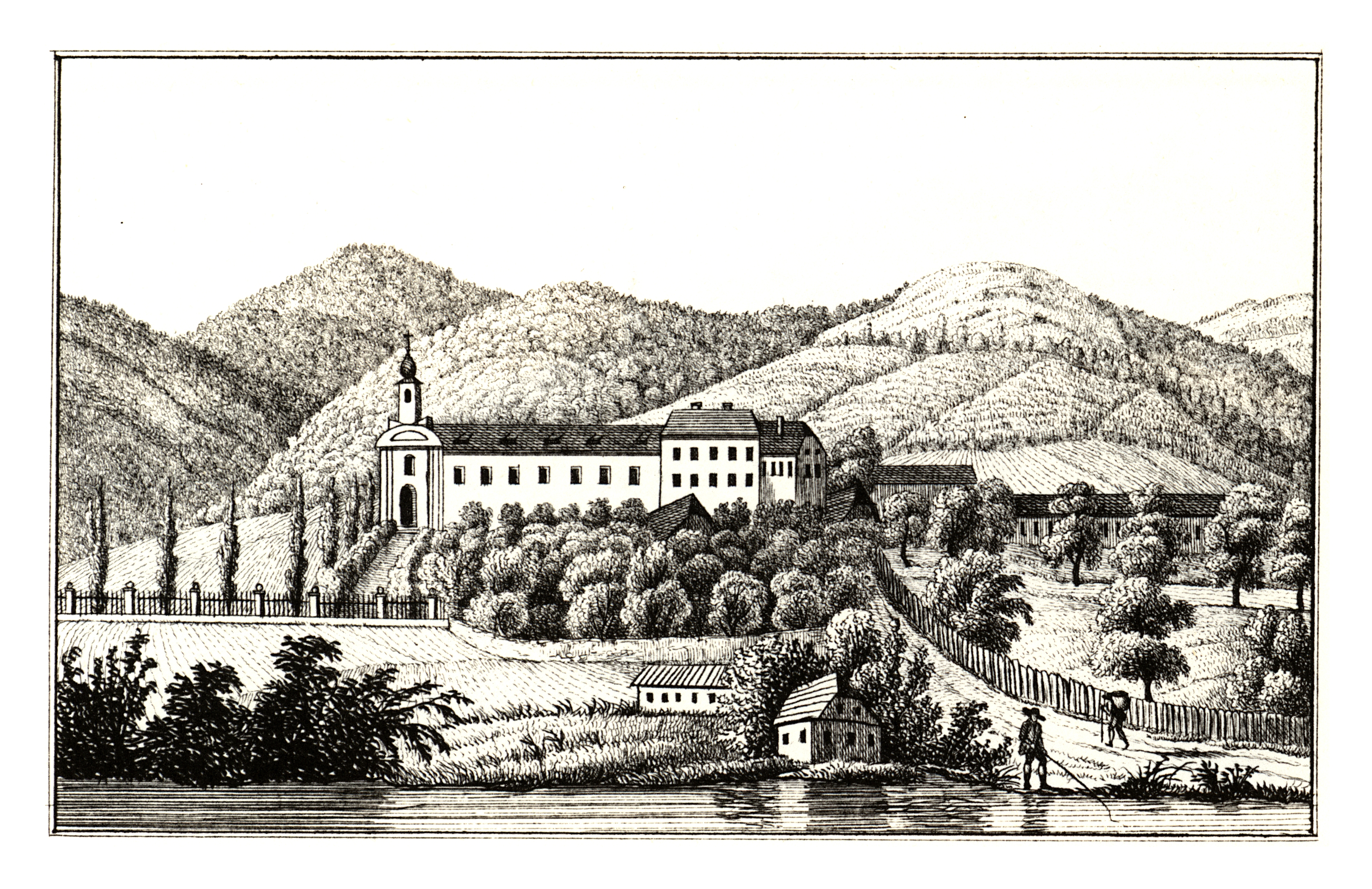
Schloß Wildhaus, 1830 lithograph by J. F. Kaiser

Lannoy returned to Graz and continued his studies until May 1809. Lannoy spent several years alternating between Vienna and the castle which his father had purchased in 1808, Schloß Wildhaus (now Castle Viltuš), between Selnica ob Dravi and Marburg on the Drau (now Maribor, Slovenia). (Note: Various refs for Schloß Wildhaus:) where he dedicated his life to music and poetry. In Graz he was a writer in the circle of Ignaz Kollmann, artist and editor of Aufmerksamen ('Observations').

He worked meritoriously and disproportionally in the service of music, less as a composer than to uplift and awake music's meaning and power. He became a member of the Gesellschaft der Musikfreunde, involving himself with oratorios and mixed concerts. Vincenz Houška conducted many of them, with Lannoy conducting in 1824–1825. Lannoy conducted the Concerts Spirituels founded by Franz X. Gebauer in 1820. After Gebauer died in 1822 aged 37, Lannoy, along with Carl Holz and Ludwig Titze continued to present the concerts. Lannoy's own music collection shows that a wide variety of contemporary music was played at these concerts.

Lannoy gave composition lessons to Johann Vesque von Püttlingen, who went on to write 300 songs under the pseudonym 'J. Hoven' (after Beethoven). The pianist child prodigy Leopoldine Blahetka had through-bass lessons with Lannoy. Lannoy was a contributor (number 22) to the fifty variations which Anton Diabelli commissioned from composers in the Austrian Empire in 1819: Beethoven responded with 33 of his own Diabelli Variations. Carl Czerny's Piano Sonata no. 11, Op. 730, was dedicated to Lannoy, as was Spohr's 5th Symphony (along with Carl Holz, Ludwig Titze and Ignaz Seyfried). Lannoy's collection of musical manuscripts included a set of 18th century parts for Mozart's Symphony no. 4, K. 181(162^{b}). (Note: This early work dating from 1764–65 may have been originally composed at 20 Frith Street, London, during the Mozart family grand tour of Europe. (Sadie 2006, pp. 83–85).)

Lannoy came into the circle of folkloric-educational endeavours centering on the unconventional Archduke John of Austria. (Note: Coincidentally, the great-great-grandfather of the conductor Nikolaus Harnoncourt) Erzherzog Johann was best man at his wedding in Wildhaus. Lannoy was keen for folk music to be annotated and written down. In conversation and in writing, he disseminated the ideas of Jean-Jacques Rousseau in Vienna, especially the musical articles in the Aesthetic Lexicon by Ignaz Jeitteles which stem from his quill ("stammen aus Lannoy's Feder").

Lannoy was a powerful impulse for cultural and musical life in Graz and Vienna. He sat on the board of directors of the Gesellschaft der Musikfreunde, conducted its concerts. He sat on the board of the Vienna Conservatory, and was its director from 1830 until 1835.

He accompanied Adelaide Kemble ('Miß Adelheid Kemble') in a performance of Schubert songs for the new King and queen of Hanover in Karlsbad on 26 August 1837, following a concert earlier in August with Leopold Jansa.

== Friends ==
His greatest reverence was reserved for Beethoven (see § Poetry), and he was on friendly terms with (alphabetically) Hector Berlioz, Alexandre Boucher, Carl Czerny, Félicien David, Gaetano Donizetti, Franz Lachner, Franz Liszt, Ignaz Moscheles, Ignaz Franz Mosel, Mozart's son Franz Xaver Wolfgang Mozart, Ignaz von Seyfried, Wenzel J Tomaschek, and Henri Vieuxtemps. He was closest to fellow clarinettist Count Ferdinando Troyer, the dedicatee of Franz Schubert's Octet in F major, D. 803. Another of his friends was Johann Vesque von Püttlingen, with whom he had composition lessons. Both came from Brussels, where their fathers had been government officials in the government of the Austrian Netherlands and were displaced by the French Revolution in 1795.

He maintained a lively exchange of letters with Mendelssohn, Henri Vieuxtemps, the Swiss composer Franz Xaver Schnyder von Wartensee and Franz Lachner.

== Works ==
His oeuvre runs to some 70 opus numbers.

=== Symphonies ===
- Symphony in E major. Pemiered 1821 at a Gesellschaft concert (Symphony in E ("auf fünf Stimmen") published in Vienna by Haslinger)
- Symphony in C major. Premiered 1822 at 6th 'Concert spirituel' Reviewed in Allgemeine musikalische Zeitung, vol. 24, pp. 360–361 (in German), plus a list of works played in the Concerts Spirituels.
- Symphony no. 3 (in B♭?) According to Wolfgang Suppan, the four movements of his third symphony – which is based on the tale of Count Lara by Lord Byron – are unified as program music by a single characteristic theme, predating Berlioz' Symphonie fantastique of 1830 by several years.

=== Operas ===
- Margarethe oder Die Räuber (1813/1814) (premiere in Graz, given in Vienna 1819)
- Olindo und Sophronia (1815)
- Rosa oder Die Einsiedeley in den Alpen (1816)
- Die Morlaken ('The Morlachs') (1817) Italian libretto by Gaetano Rossi, translated by Lannoy. (premiere Graz 1817)
- Libussa, Böhmens erste Königin (1818/1819) (premiere Brno)
- Die Europäer in Ostindien (1823)
- I due forzati (1825)
- Der Schreckenstein (1825)
- Des Liedes Macht (1826), unfinished
- Schloß Darville (1839), unfinished

=== Singspiels ===
- Jery und Bätely (1816)
- Kätly (1827) (premiere 24 April Burgtheater Vienna)
- Zauberer Papagei und König Bär, Zaubererspiel (1830)

=== Melodramas ===
- Ein Uhr, oder Der Zauberbund um Mitternacht (1822) Text by Wilhelm Vogel (1772–1843), from the English of Matthew ("Monk") Lewis.
- Der Mörder (1822)
- Carlos Romaldi (1822)
- Emmy Teels (1823)
- Die beiden Galeerensklaven (1823)
- Der Löwe von Florenz (1823)
- Abu, der schwarze Wundermann (1826) (produced in Vienna and Germany 1826–1830)

=== Other works ===
Works with known Opus number

- Piano Sonata in A, Op. 6 (pub Mechetti)
- Erstes Rondo in C, Op. 7 (pub Haslinger)
- Grand Sonata in A♭ minor, Op. 9
- Grand quintet in E♭, Op. 12, for oboe, clarinet, horn, bassoon and piano
- Grand Trio für Klavier, Klarinette und Cello, Op. 15
- Grosses Trio für Klavier, Violon und Violoncell, Op. 16. Vienna: S. A. Steiner (1820)
- Variations and Polonaise for Violin, Op. 17
- National-Tanz und Sangweisen des osterreichischen Kaiserstaats. Eine Sammlung charakteristischer Rondo's leichter Art, Book 1: Austria. Book 2: Styria, Opp. 30, 31
- Lieder, Op. 48
- Song, General Hentzi. Poem by Bartholomäus von Carneri, for soprano (or tenor.) Op. 68. Vienna: Mechetti
- 6 easy Polonaises for piano, Op. 69

Without Opus number

- Overture and entractes for Castelli's play Tsar Ivan.
- 3 sonatas for violin and piano
- Adagio and Polonaise for violin and piano (Bravura Variations?)
- Variations on a theme from Rossini's Zelmira for piano

Songs

- "Inno di Piero Maroncelli" (1838)
- Romance (words by La Fontaine) (1838)
- Romance (1838)
- "Lied der Schmetterlinge" (Song of the Butterflies) (words by Rückert) (1839)
- Two duets for mezzo-soprano and contralto, with piano (1840)
- "An die Sterne" (To the Stars) (words by Rückert) (1841)
- "Schön bist du" (Rückert) (1842)
- "Zwölf Freier" (Rückert) ('Twelve suitors would I have') (1842)
- "Canzonetta veneziana" (1842)
- "Abendlied" (Rückert) (1844?)
- "Odalisque aux doux yeux" [Song, begins: "Livre aux vents du Bosphore"] (1845)

== Poetry ==
Beethoven

Die Urkraft wohnet in des Bergen Tiefen
Und fördert nie Geahndetes zum Licht;
Sie wecket Stürme, die gefesselt schliefen,
Ein feur'gen Strom aus hohen Crater bricht.

Doch wo die Glutenbäche tödtend liefen,
Da wächst die Rose bald auf neuer Schicht
Und wo empört die Winde heulend riefen,
Der Edelstein mit Phöbos Glanze ficht.

Du bist der Berg, die Kraft in Busen wohnet,
Du strebst hinan zu dem, der straft und lohnet,
Berührst im Fluge alle Seelesaiten:

Er klingt in Dir die Welt mit Lust, mit Schmerzen;
Du singst; es dringet jeder Ton zum Herzen;
Dir horchen alle Menschen, alle Zeiten.

Elemental power dwells in the mountain deeps
And struggles unavenged towards the light;
It wakes the tempests, enthralled with sleep,
A fiery flood breaks from the crater's height.

But where once flowed the deadly glowing streams,
Soon grows the wild rose on stratums new
And where th' indignant winds cried wailing
The precious gem with Phoebus' brilliance gleams.

You are the rock, power dwells in your breast,
You inward reach to him who fines and pays,
In flight you strike a chord in every soul:

In you the world resounds with joy, with pain;
You sing; each tone penetrates our hearts;
All mankind hearkens to you, every age.

== Family ==
In 1819 he married Magdalena Katharina Josephine, daughter of Franz Xaver von Carneri. They had no children. They adopted a son, Rudolf Oskar Freiherr von Gödel-Lannoy (1814–1883): (Note: Other people called Gödel-Lannoy, relationship uncertain: Book by C. Freiherr von Gödel-Lannoy, Die kirchlichen Verhältnisse auf Corfu zur Zeit der venezianischen Herrschaft; In the Annalen des k. k. naturhistorischen Hofmuseums 1893 – Staff of Museum Departments: c) Mineralogisch-petrographische Abtheilung. "Andererseits bemühten sich für uns die Herren...Excellenz Freiherr Emil Gödel-Lannoy..."; Hermann Gödel-Lannoy (1820–1892) (born Hermann Gödel). Sudden death of Hermann Freiherr von G-L, son of Franz Salis Gödel (Kreisrichtesbeamter?). Studied in Graz, Vienna and Padua, D. Jur. et Phil. Finanz-Procutor in Pressburg, Venice, and lastly Vienna. 1886 Civil Commissar of the Southern Army. Order of the Iron Crown III class, later II class on retirement. Freiherr 1873, Honorary Freiherr des Maltheserordens – Sovereign Military Order of Malta RC Lay & Military order. His three children died young, and he adopted his nephew Richard Freiherr von Basso Gödel-Lannoy, who was Sr. Excellenz Linienschiffs-Lieutenant in 1888; See also Countess de Lannoy, born Gräfin Looz, possibly no relation.)

In 1855 he was Consul-General of Syria & Palestine, in Beirut: Consul-General in Jassy, Moldavia, (now Iași, Romania), from October 1855 to 1862: Präsident der Central-Seebehörde Triest (Central Maritime Agency, Trieste) in 1868 and Ritter der L. Ordnungs. See also Exequatur and Schachbender – (Ottoman Consul) He was on the board of directors of the K.K. priv. Südbahn-Gesellschaft in 1872 de:Südbahn (Österreich) – Verwaltungsrath in Wien. "At the same time plans for a direct connection through the Alps were developed, promoted by Archduke John of Austria – [who knew Johann Vesque de Puttlingen) to open up the Styrian lands beyond Semmering Pass." (Southern Railway) He was a founder member of the Vienna Geographical Society from 1856. and a member of the Vienna Meteorological Society.
