= Świerki, Lower Silesian Voivodeship =

Świerki
- Village
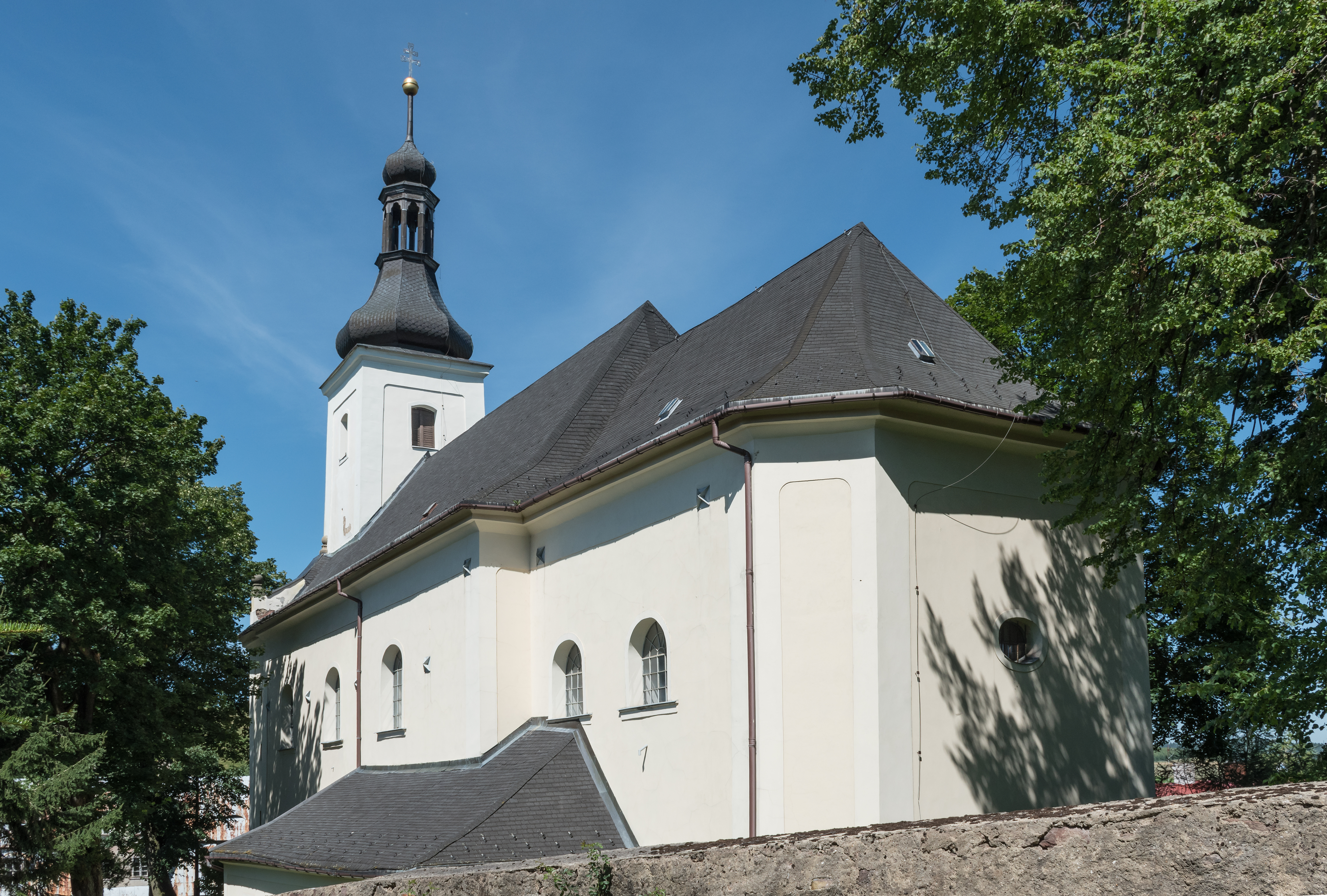
- Saint Nicholas Church

- Location within Poland
- Coordinates: 50°37′49″N 16°26′22″E
- Country: Poland
- Voivodeship: Lower Silesian
- County: Kłodzko
- Gmina: Nowa Ruda

Świerki (Polish: [ˈɕfjɛrkʲi]) is a village in the administrative district of Gmina Nowa Ruda, within Kłodzko County, Lower Silesian Voivodeship, in south-western Poland.
