= Ludwikowice Kłodzkie =

- Village
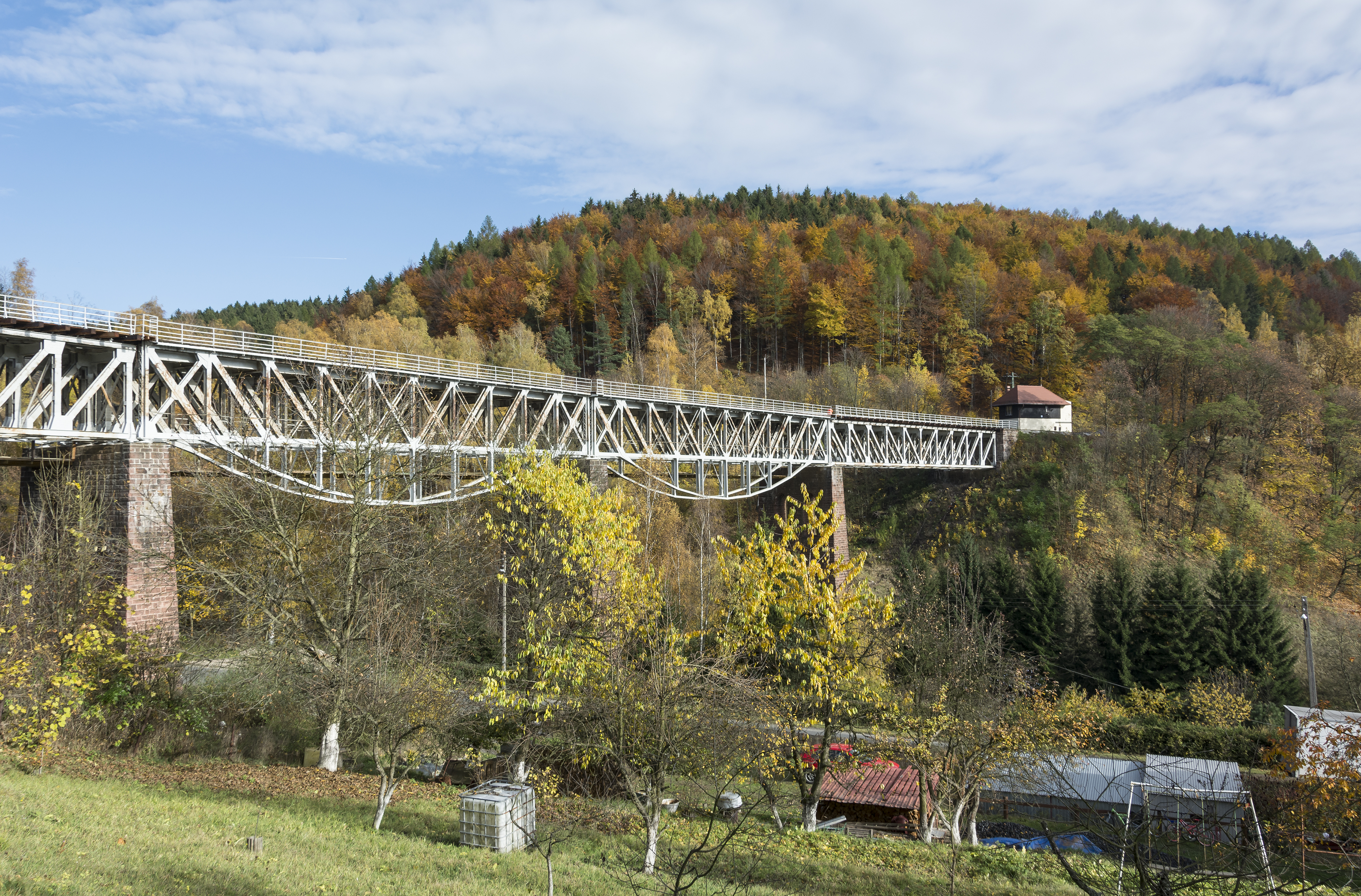
- Railway viaduct in Ludwikowice Kłodzkie

- Location within Poland
- Coordinates: 50°37′04″N 16°28′42″E
- Country: Poland
- Voivodeship: Lower Silesian
- County: Kłodzko
- Gmina: Nowa Ruda
- First mentioned: 1352
- Highest elevation: 650 m (2,130 ft)

Population
  - Total: 2,540
- Time zone: UTC+1 (CET)
  - Summer (DST): UTC+2 (CEST)
- Vehicle registration: DKL

Ludwikowice Kłodzkie [ludvikɔˈvit͡sɛ ˈkwɔt͡skʲɛ] is a village in the administrative district of Gmina Nowa Ruda, within Kłodzko County, Lower Silesian Voivodeship, in south-western Poland.

There is a historic Church of St. Michael the Archangel and a museum in the village.

== History ==
The oldest known mention of the village comes from 1352, although it certainly existed earlier. Between 1871 and 1945, it was part of Germany. During World War II in 1942, the Germans established a forced labour camp for Jews in the village and a forced labour subcamp of the Nazi prison in Kłodzko. A group of Polish forced laborers were sent to the Nazi prison in Kłodzko for making contact with Jewish forced laborers. In 1944, it was transformed into a subcamp of the Gross-Rosen concentration camp, intended for Jewish women. Of about 600 imprisoned women, up to 300 died. In January 1945 the Ludwigsdorf railway disaster in Ludwikowice Kłodzkie caused at least 60 deaths.

== Transport ==
The Ludwikowice Kłodzkie station is located in the village.

== Gallery ==
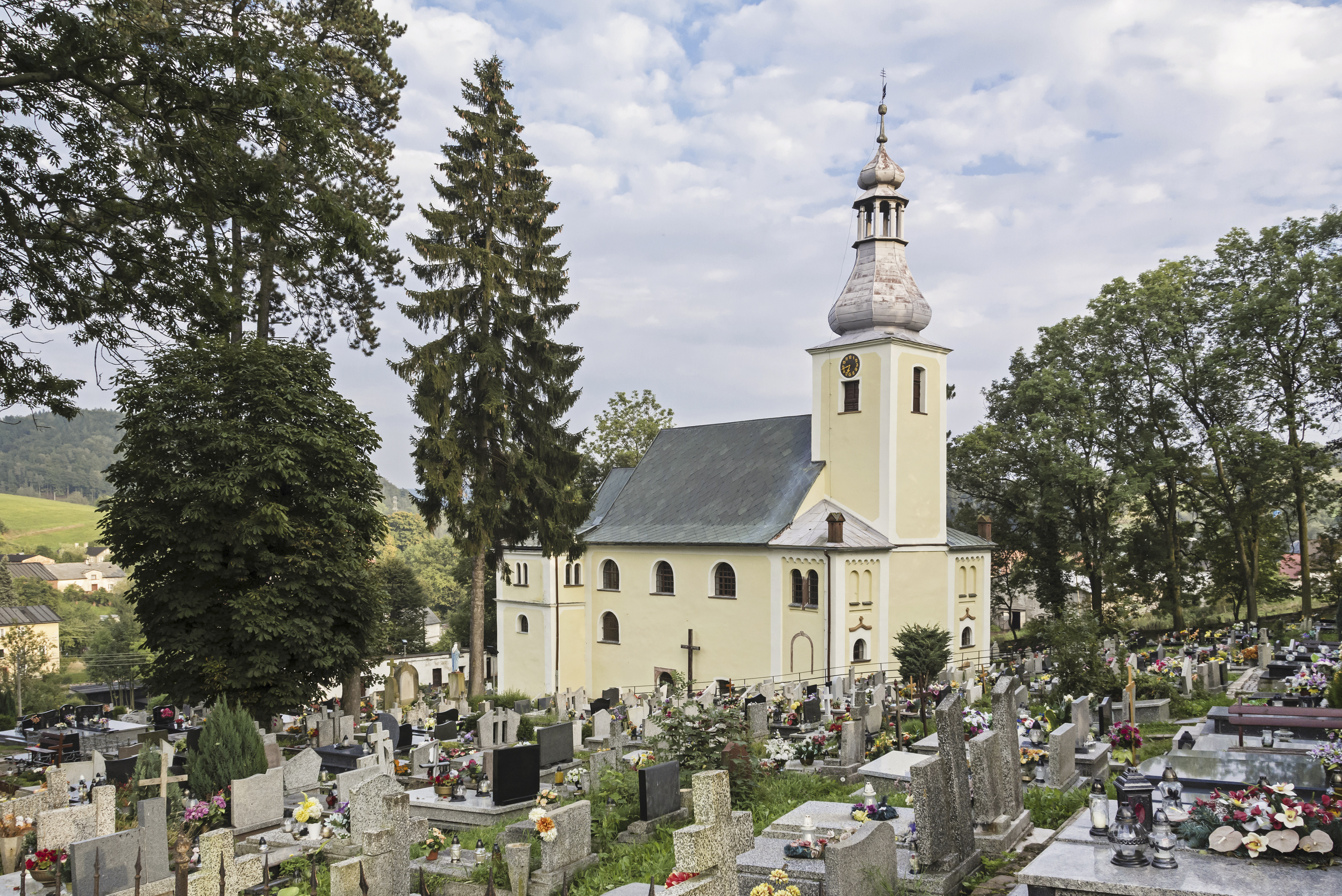
Church of St. Michael the Archangel

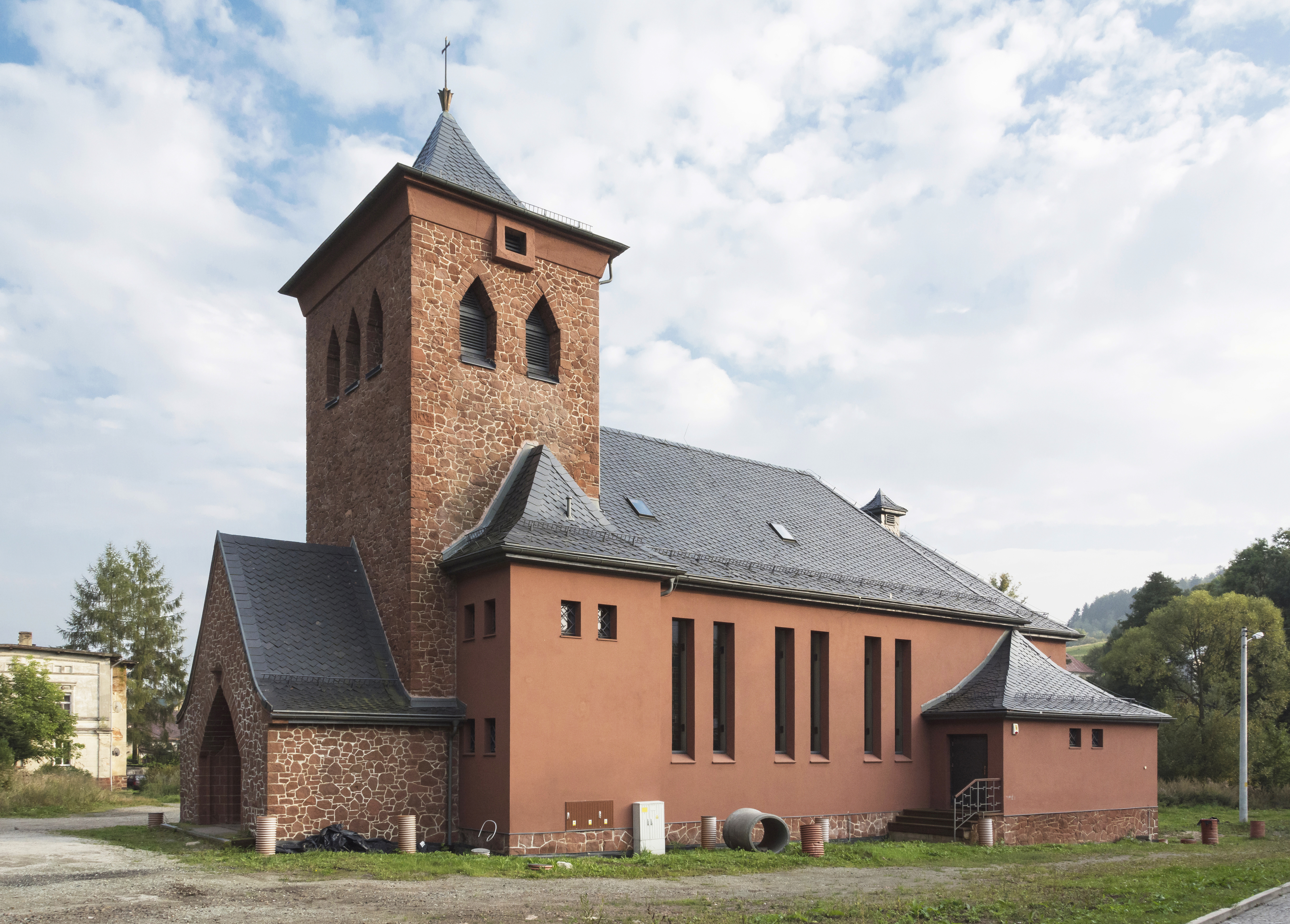
Museum

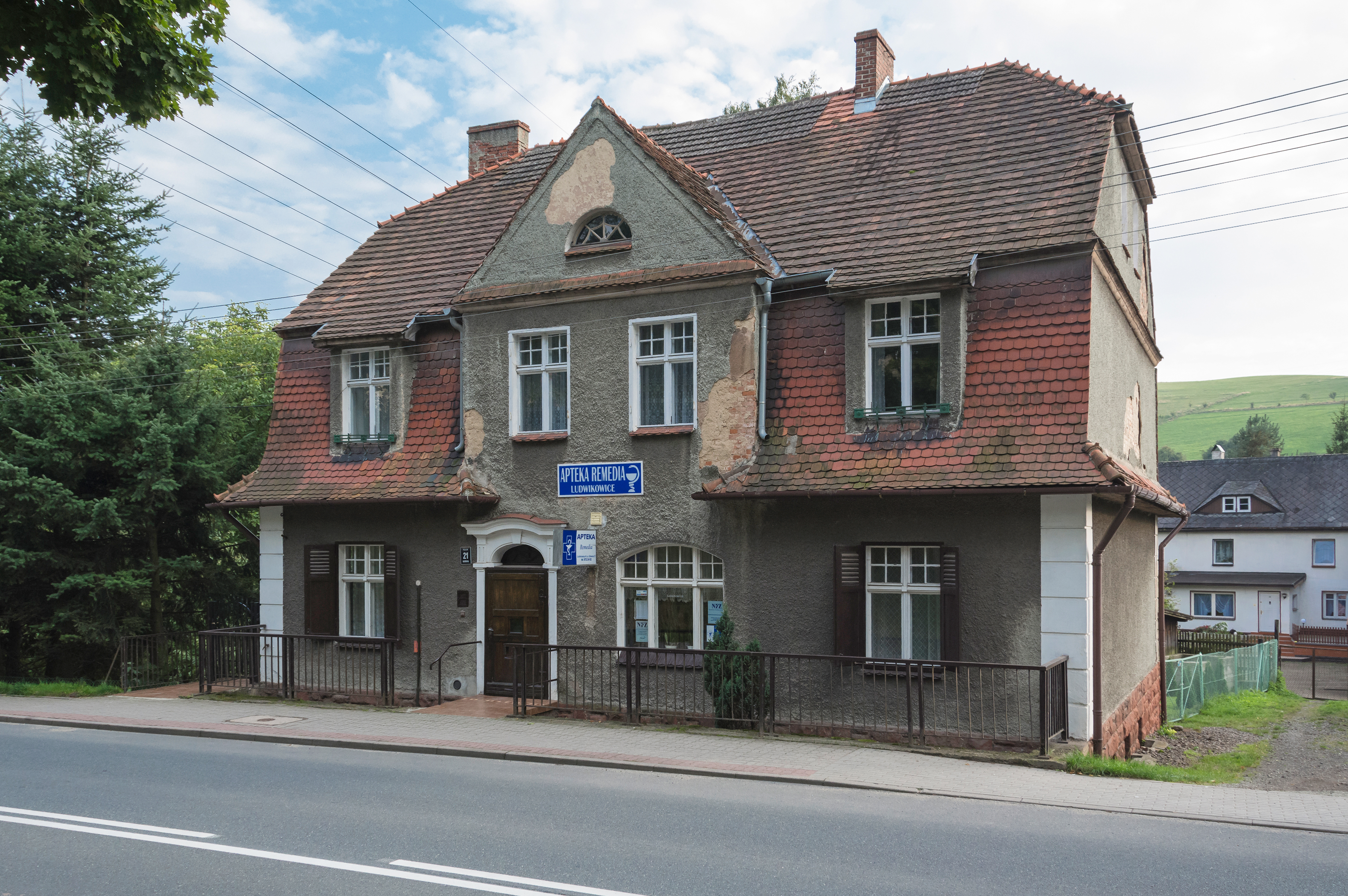
Pharmacy

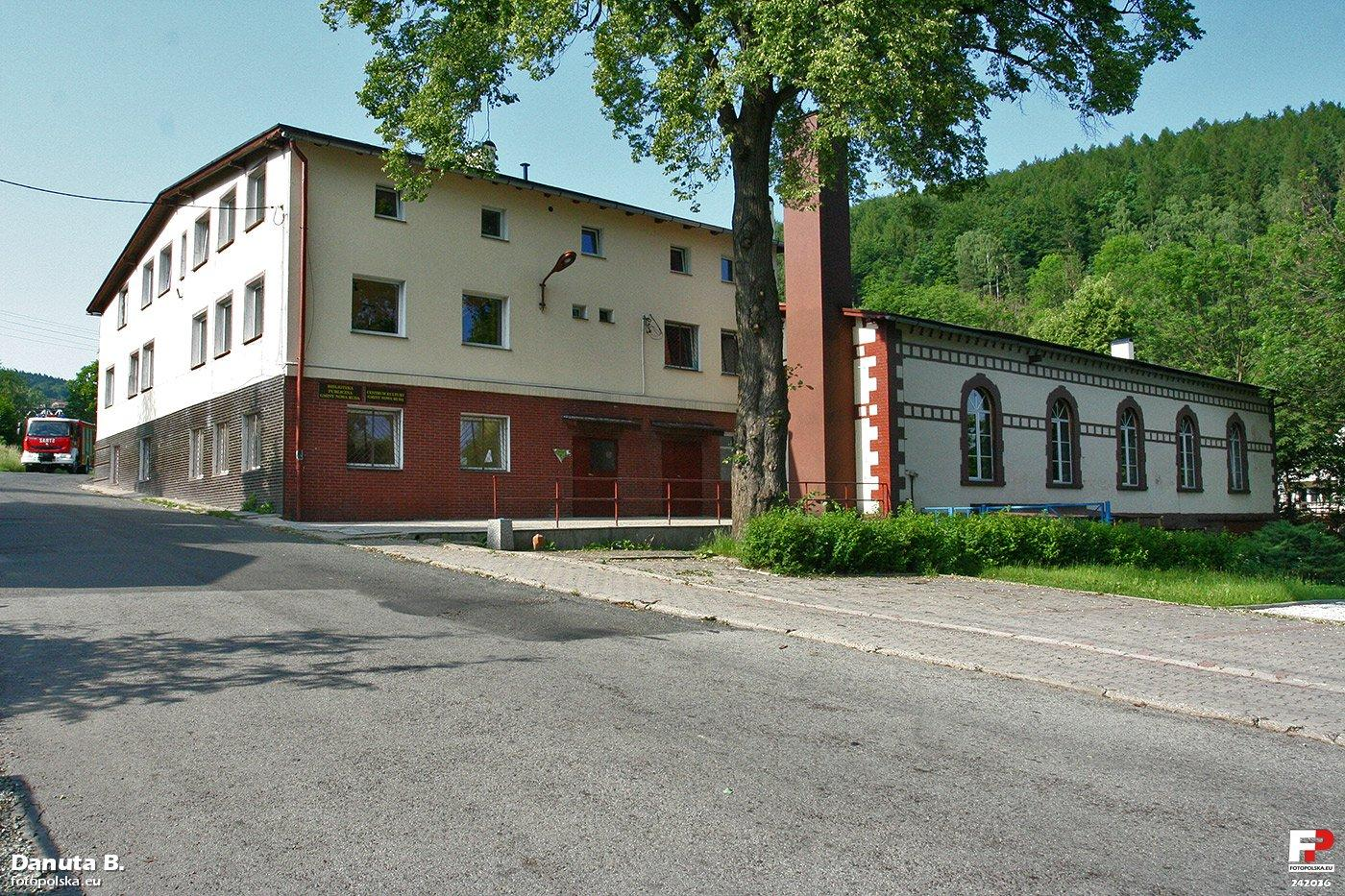
Culture centre and library
