= Bartnica =

- Village
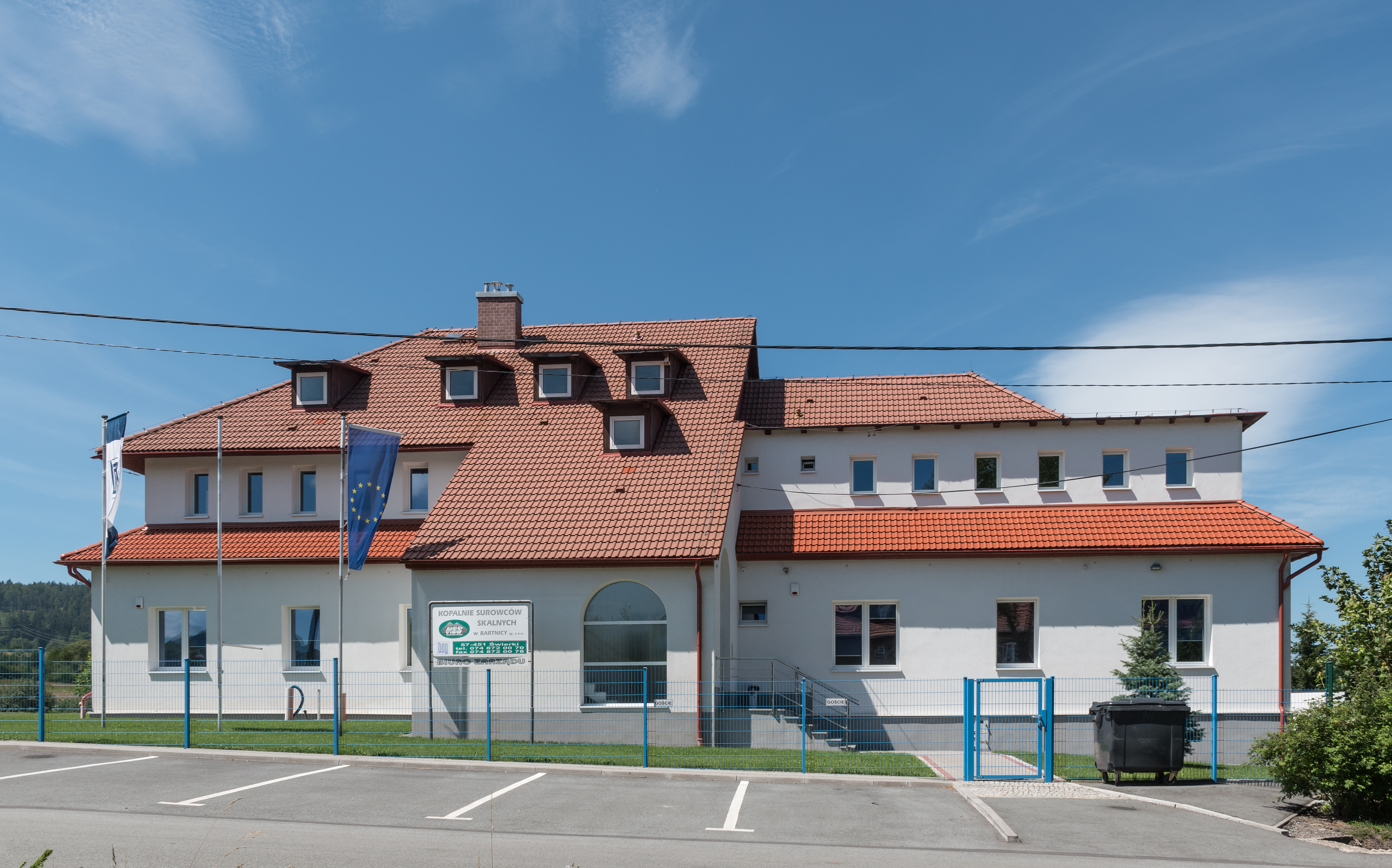
- Quarry mining company office building

- Location within Poland
- Coordinates: 50°38′29″N 16°24′37″E
- Country: Poland
- Voivodeship: Lower Silesian
- County: Kłodzko
- Gmina: Nowa Ruda
- Highest elevation: 630 m (2,070 ft)
- Population: 270

Bartnica [bartˈnit͡sa] is a village in the administrative district of Gmina Nowa Ruda, within Kłodzko County, Lower Silesian Voivodeship, in south-western Poland.
