= Nowa Wieś Kłodzka =

- Village
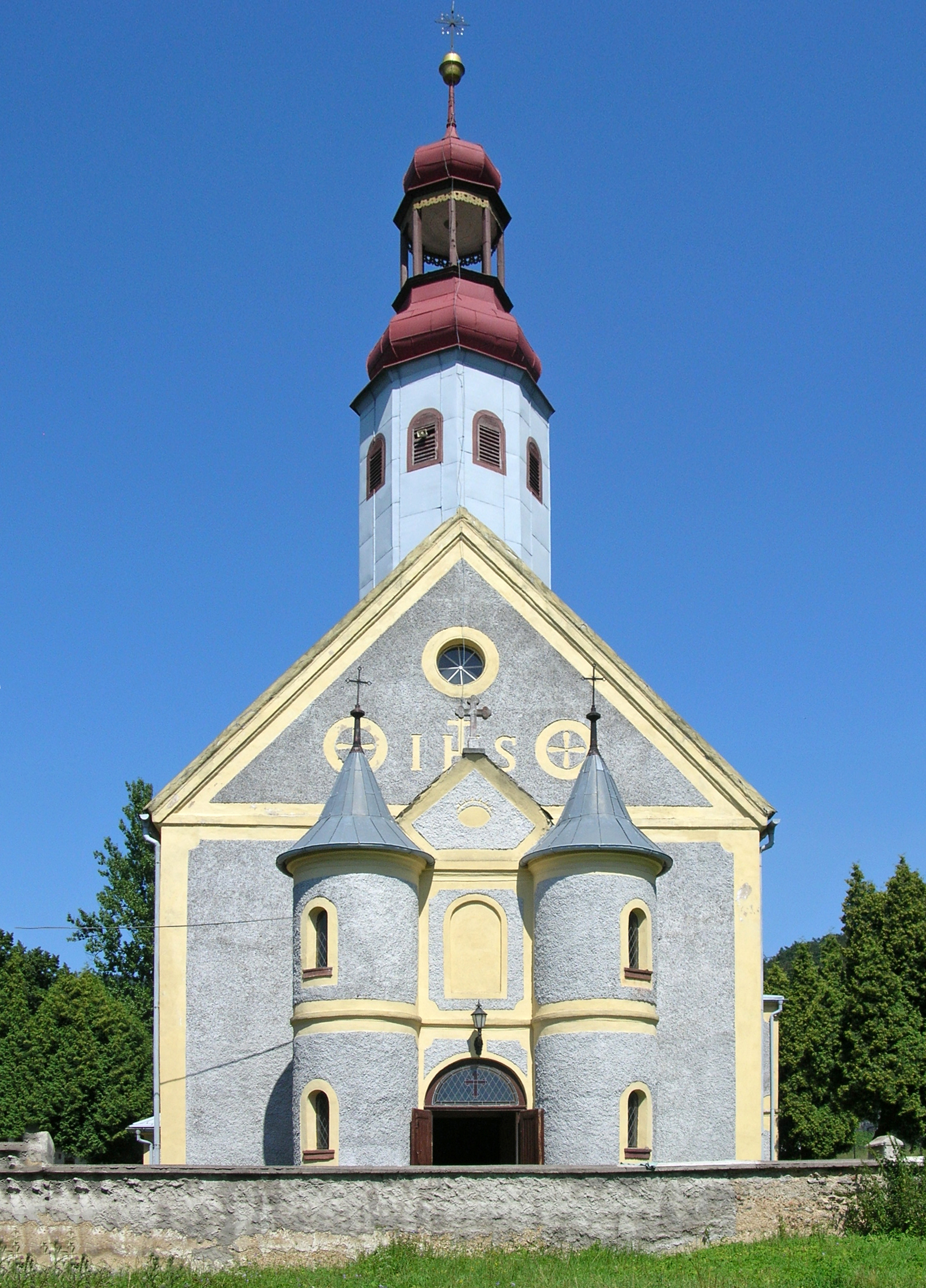
- Church of the Exaltation of the Holy Cross

- Location within Poland
- Coordinates: 50°33′42″N 16°36′36″E
- Country: Poland
- Voivodeship: Lower Silesian
- County: Kłodzko
- Gmina: Nowa Ruda

Population
  - Total: 250

Nowa Wieś Kłodzka [ˈnɔva ˈvjɛɕ ˈkwɔt͡ska] is a village in the administrative district of Gmina Nowa Ruda, within Kłodzko County, Lower Silesian Voivodeship, in south-western Poland.
