= Przygórze =

- Village
- Przygórze

- Location within Poland
- Coordinates: 50°37′N 16°34′E
- Country: Poland
- Voivodeship: Lower Silesian
- County: Kłodzko
- Gmina: Nowa Ruda
- Elevation: 480 m (1,570 ft)

Population
  - Total: 860

Przygórze [pʂɨˈɡuʐɛ] is a village in the administrative district of Gmina Nowa Ruda, within Kłodzko County, Lower Silesian Voivodeship, in south-western Poland.
