= Esperke =

- Ortsteil of Neustadt am Rübenberge
- Coat of arms
- Interactive map of Esperke
- Location within Germany Location within Lower Saxony
- Coordinates: 52°37′37″N 9°36′23″E
- Country: Germany
- State: Lower Saxony
- District: Hanover
- Town: Neustadt am Rübenberge

Area
  - Total: 12.22 km^{2} (4.72 sq mi)
- Elevation: 32 m (105 ft)

Population (2021)
  - Total: 701
  - Density: 57.4/km^{2} (149/sq mi)
- Time zone: UTC+01:00 (CET)
  - Summer (DST): UTC+02:00 (CEST)
- Postal codes: 31535
- Dialling codes: 05073

Esperke is a village in Hanover Region, Lower Saxony in Germany. It is part of the town Neustadt am Rübenberge. In 2021 it had a population of 701.

Esperke and the neighbouring districts of Helstorf, Luttmersen, Vesbeck and Warmeloh are part of the Ortsrat Helstorf (Helstorf local council) area.

== History ==
The first written mention of Esperke, at the time spelled Esperch, was in the year 1268.

Esperke provided the core immigrants to the Hanoverian settlement in Freedom Township, Lafayette County, Missouri, USA during the period 1837–1860.

Under a local government reform in 1974, the area became part the Stadt ("city") of Neustadt am Rübenberge.

== Politics ==
The Ortsbürgermeisterin (local mayor) is Ute Bertram Kuehn (SPD). The other members of the Ortsrat are Peter Kruger, Jens Metterhausen (both CDU) and Hans-Heinrich Thies (SPD). The council's liaison officer for Esperke is Otto Brackhan.

== Blazon ==
The coat of arms features a golden sailboat on a green background.

== Culture and sights ==
- Esperke has a small Gothic chapel.
- The Blankes Flat nature reserve in Esperke-Warmeloh features a bog lake, along with rare plant and animal life.

== People ==
Heinrich Feisthauer spent the last years of his life in Esperke.
