= Czerwieńczyce =

- Village
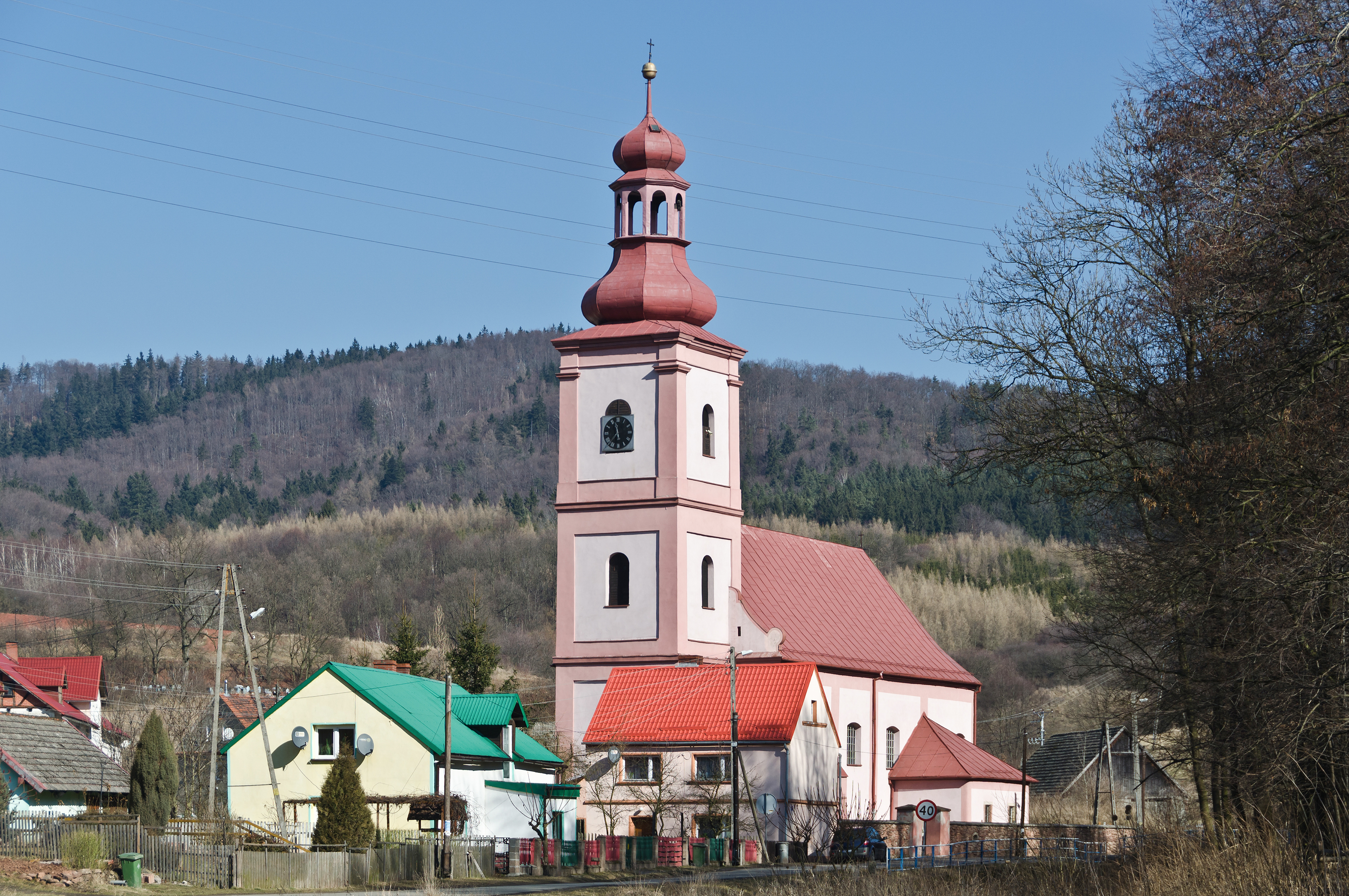
- Saint Bartholomew Church

- Location within Poland
- Coordinates: 50°32′21″N 16°36′10″E
- Country: Poland
- Voivodeship: Lower Silesian
- County: Kłodzko
- Gmina: Nowa Ruda

Czerwieńczyce [t͡ʂɛrvjɛɲˈt͡ʂɨt͡sɛ] is a village in the administrative district of Gmina Nowa Ruda, within Kłodzko County, Lower Silesian Voivodeship, in south-western Poland.
