= Jugów =

- Village
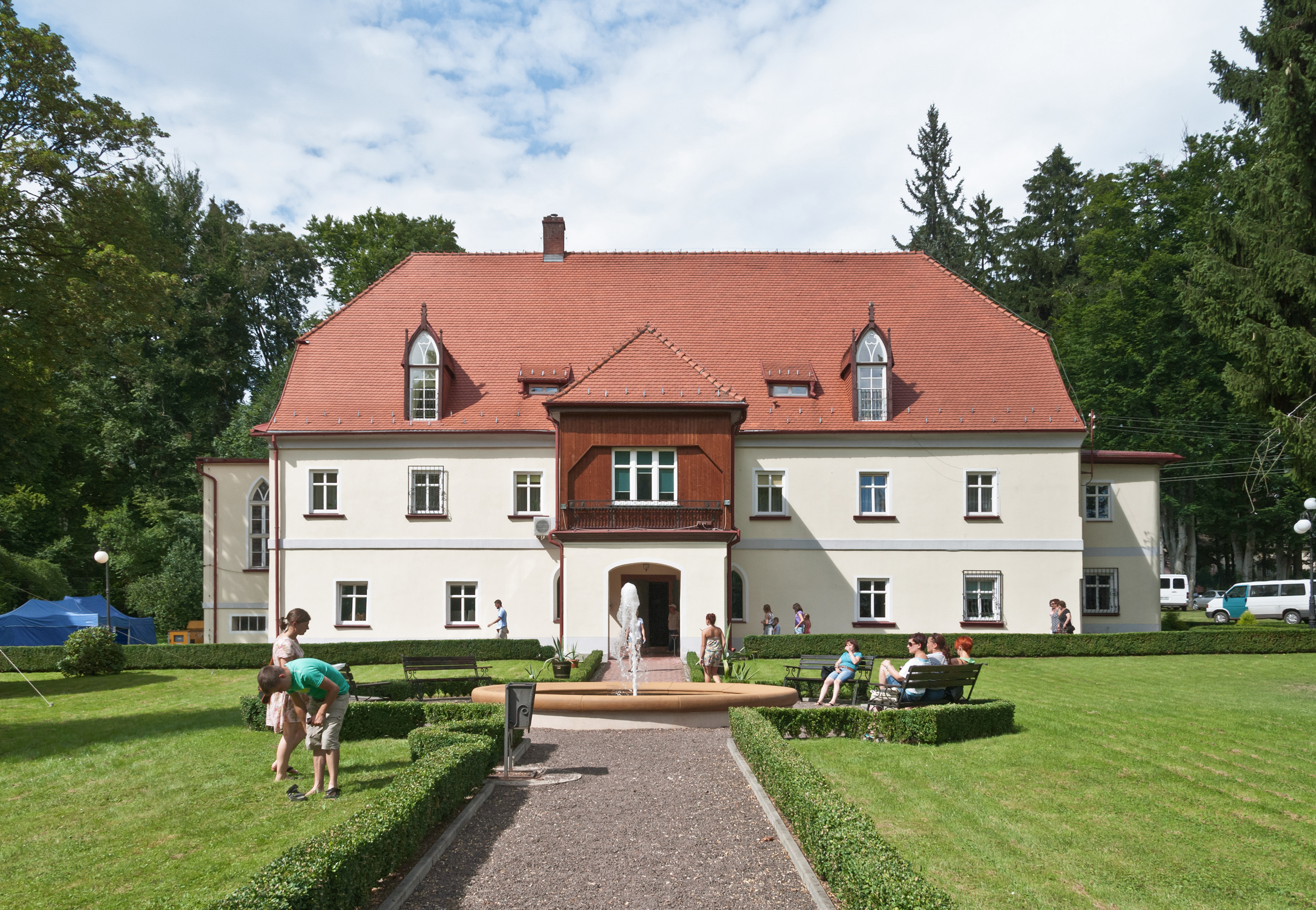
- Jugów Palace and park

- Location within Poland
- Coordinates: 50°38′03″N 16°30′42″E
- Country: Poland
- Voivodeship: Lower Silesian
- County: Kłodzko
- Gmina: Nowa Ruda
- Highest elevation: 680 m (2,230 ft)
- Population: 3,500

Jugów [ˈjuɡuf] is a village in the administrative district of Gmina Nowa Ruda, within Kłodzko County, Lower Silesian Voivodeship, in south-western Poland.
