= Dworki, Lower Silesian Voivodeship =

Dworki
- Village
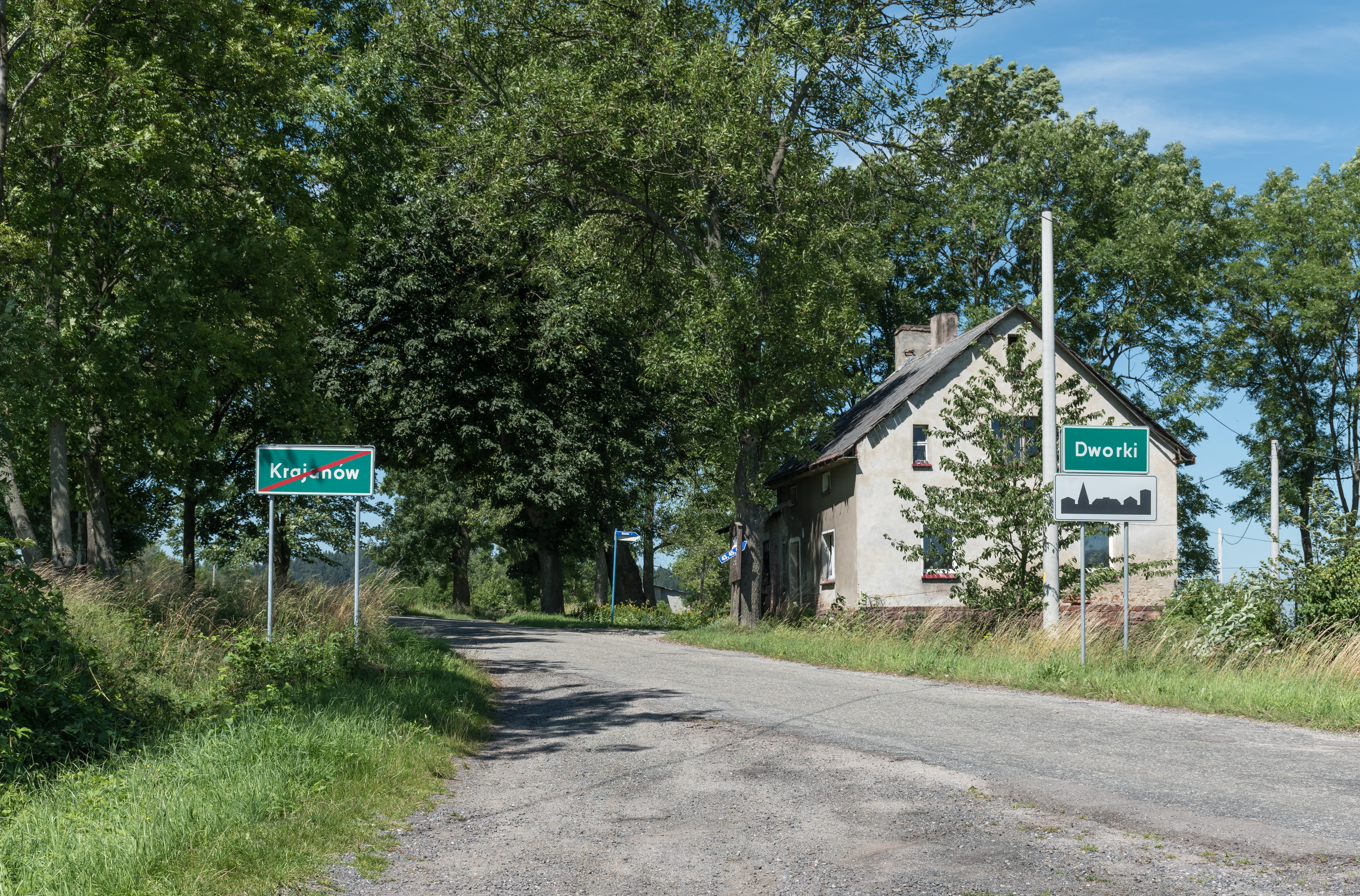
- Entering Dworki from the direction of Krajanów

- Location within Poland
- Coordinates: 50°36′56″N 16°25′18″E
- Country: Poland
- Voivodeship: Lower Silesian
- County: Kłodzko
- Gmina: Nowa Ruda

Dworki [ˈdvɔrki] is a village in the administrative district of Gmina Nowa Ruda, within Kłodzko County, Lower Silesian Voivodeship, in south-western Poland.
