= Sokolica, Lower Silesian Voivodeship =

Sokolica
- Village
- Location within Poland
- Coordinates: 50°35′36″N 16°27′56″E
- Country: Poland
- Voivodeship: Lower Silesian
- County: Kłodzko
- Gmina: Nowa Ruda

Population
  - Total: 100

Sokolica [sɔkɔˈlit͡sa] is a village in the administrative district of Gmina Nowa Ruda, within Kłodzko County, Lower Silesian Voivodeship, in south-western Poland.
