= Dzikowiec, Lower Silesian Voivodeship =

Dzikowiec
- Village
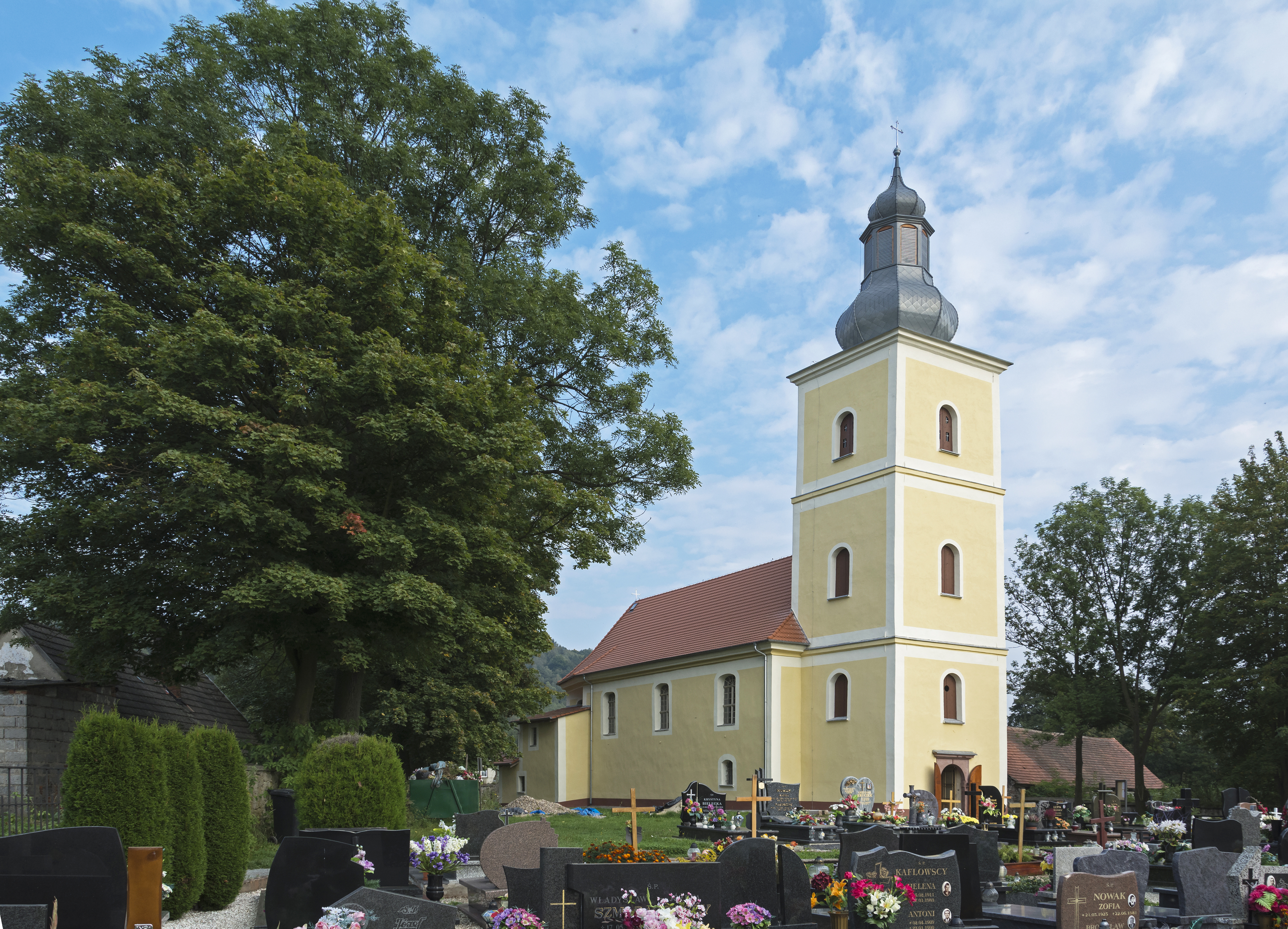
- Saint Martin Church

- Location within Poland
- Coordinates: 50°34′17″N 16°34′22″E
- Country: Poland
- Voivodeship: Lower Silesian
- County: Kłodzko
- Gmina: Nowa Ruda
- Population: 940

Dzikowiec [d͡ʑiˈkɔvjɛt͡s] is a village in the administrative district of Gmina Nowa Ruda, within Kłodzko County, Lower Silesian Voivodeship, in south-western Poland.
