= Włodowice, Lower Silesian Voivodeship =

Włodowice
- Village
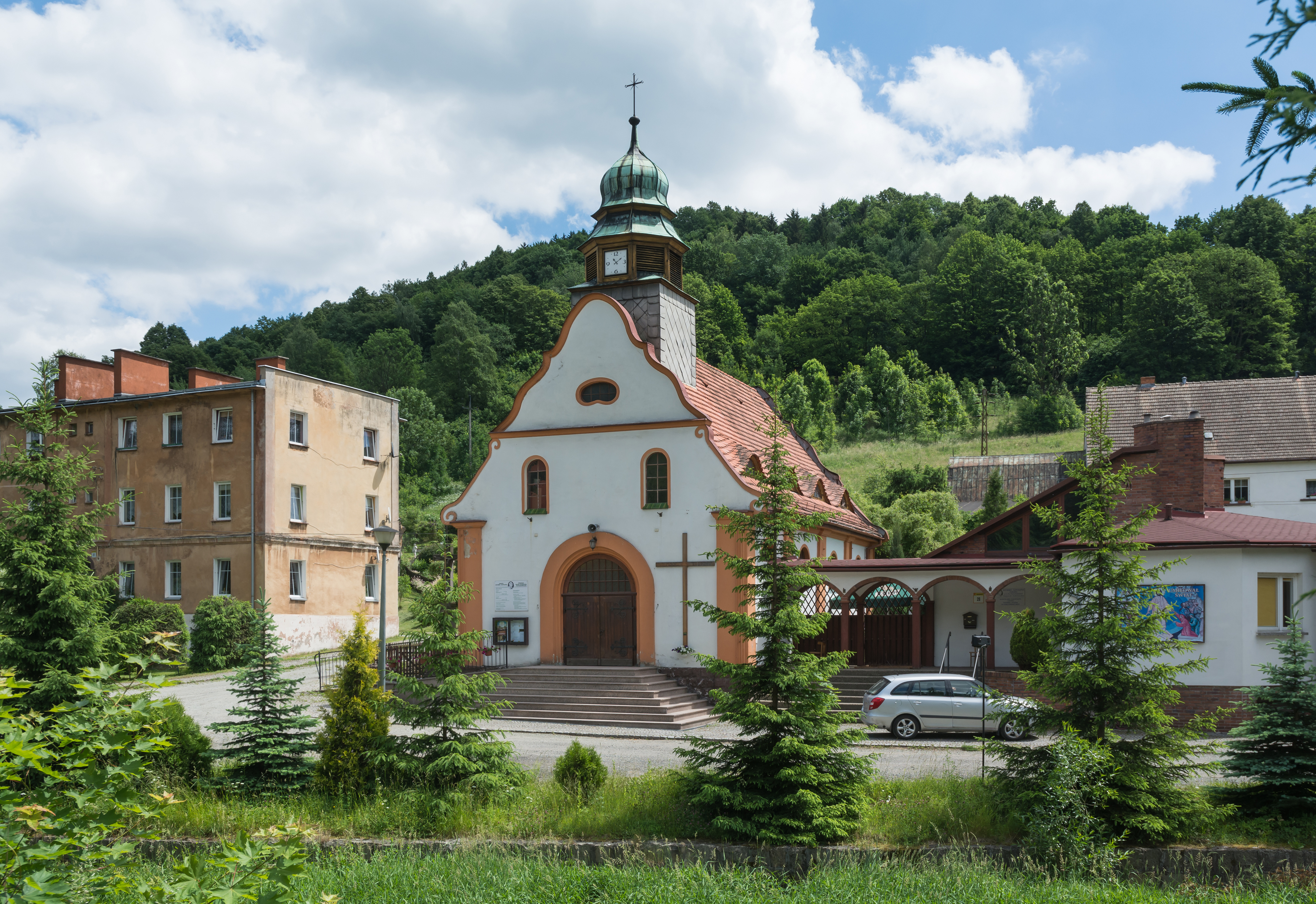
- Church of Saint Peter Canisius

- Location within Poland
- Coordinates: 50°34′24″N 16°28′28″E
- Country: Poland
- Voivodeship: Lower Silesian
- County: Kłodzko
- Gmina: Nowa Ruda

Population
  - Total: 790

Włodowice [vwɔdɔˈvit͡sɛ] is a village in the administrative district of Gmina Nowa Ruda, within Kłodzko County, Lower Silesian Voivodeship, in south-western Poland.
