= Bożków =

- Village
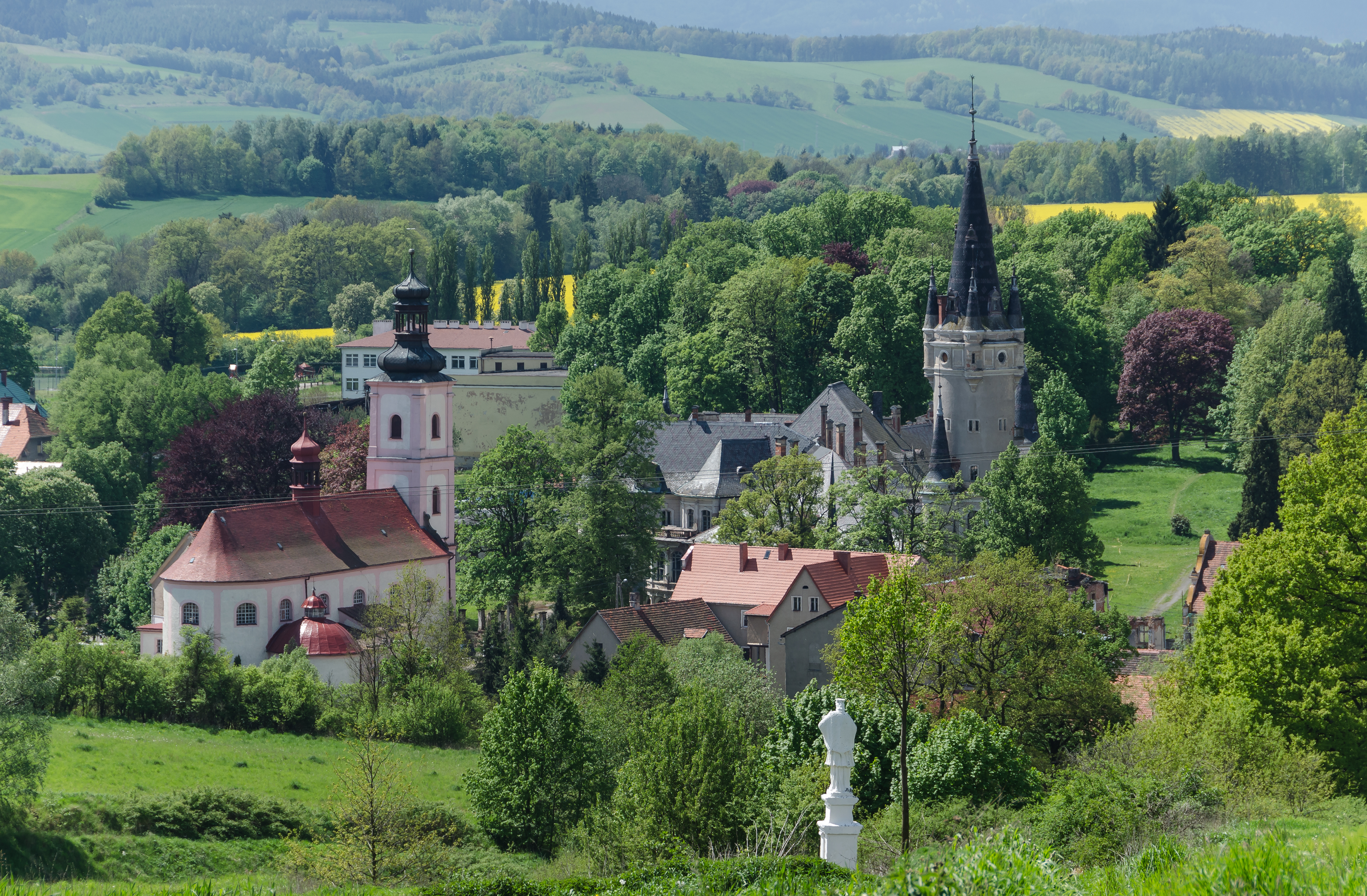
- View of Bożków with the Saints Peter and Paul church on the left and Bożków Palace on the right

- Location within Poland
- Coordinates: 50°31′N 16°34′E
- Country: Poland
- Voivodeship: Lower Silesian
- County: Kłodzko
- Gmina: Nowa Ruda
- First mentioned: 1348
- Population: 1,600
- Time zone: UTC+1 (CET)
  - Summer (DST): UTC+2 (CEST)
- Vehicle registration: DKL

Bożków (pronounced Bosh-koof [ˈbɔʂkuf]) is a village in the administrative district of Gmina Nowa Ruda, within Kłodzko County, Lower Silesian Voivodeship, in south-western Poland.

== History ==
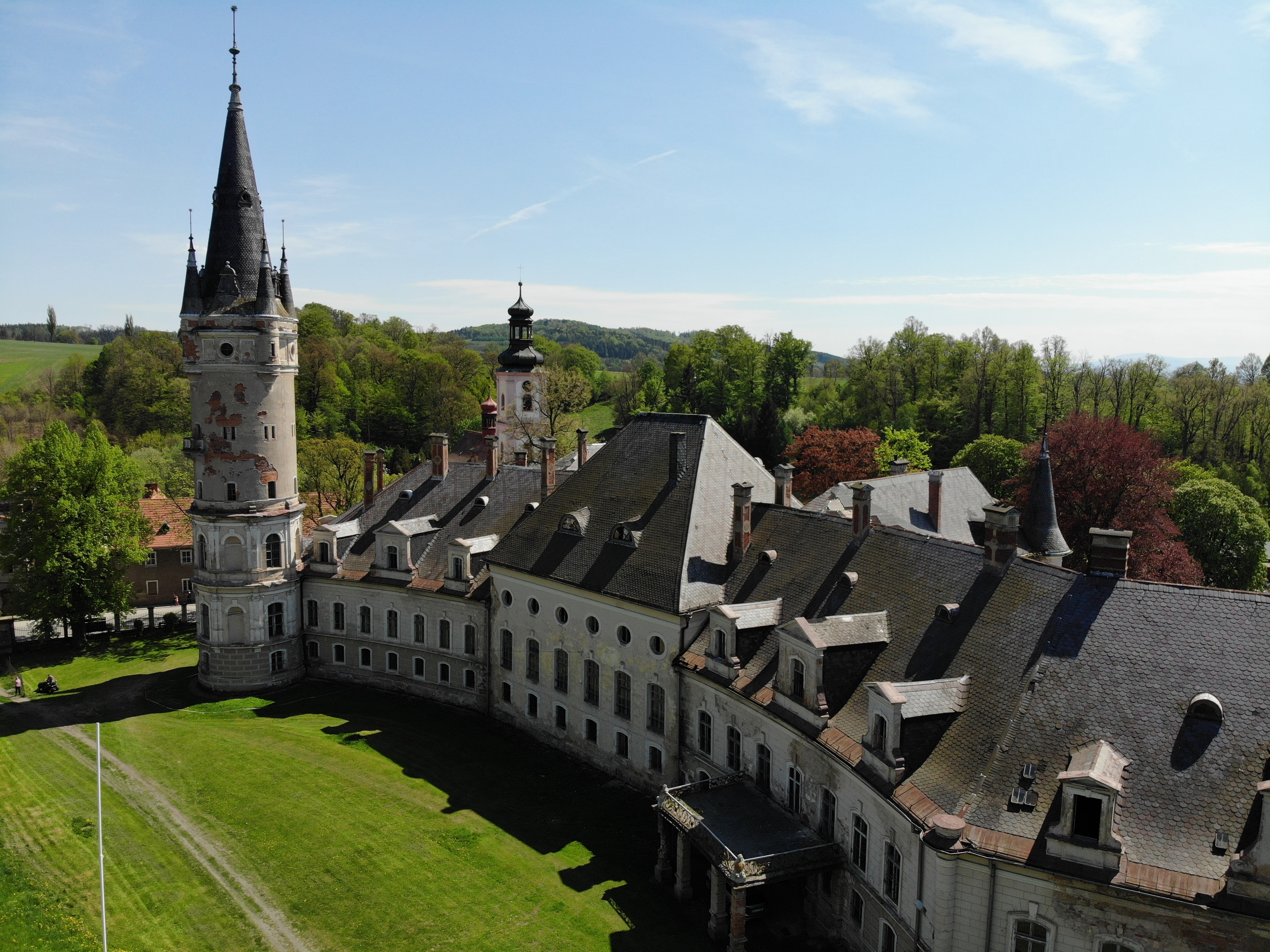
Bożków Palace

The village is located in Kłodzko Land, a territory which often passed between Polish and Bohemian rulers in the Middle Ages. The first document that mentioned village of Bożków is dated back to 1348 – it noted that Berhardt von Maltwitz was the owner of the village. During the Thirty Years' War the property was confiscated by Ferdinand II and sold or given to Kasper Jaeschke von Eisenhut, an ennobled imperial physician (1633). After his childless death, his widow gave the property to the Kłodzko Jesuits order. John George von Goetzen (b. 1626), starost of the Kłodzko county bought the estate from the order. The Count Anthony Alexander von Magnis finally bought the rights to Bożków in 1780. The property was inherited by Friedrich Wilhelm Antoni Karol Fabricius von Magnis (1786–1861), who was succeeded by his son Wilhelm Ernest Adolf (1828–1888), and then by his grandson Franciszek Wilhelm Karol (b. 1862). The property belonged to the von Magnis family until 1945.

A labour camp of the Reich Labour Service was operated in the village under Nazi Germany. After World War II, Lower Silesia became again part of Poland and the palace became state property. It was gradually turning into a ruin, the interiors were mostly destroyed and even stolen. In 1956, a partial renovation was done. Later, the palace was housing a local school for many years. The Polish drama film Shivers from 1981 was filmed in the Bożków Palace. Currently, the palace is in private hands. In February 2021, it was again offered for sale.

== People from Bożków ==
- Franz Xaver Gebauer (1784–1822), composer, and promoter of 'Concerts spirituels' in Vienna.
- Heinrich Feisthauer, political opponent of the Nazi-regime and a survivor of Sachsenhausen.
- Adolph Strauch, landscape architect who worked primarily in the United States.
- Franz Magnis-Suseno, Jesuit, rector of the philosophical school in Jakarta, Indonesia.
