= Tomasz Leśniowski =

Polish poet and cultural animator

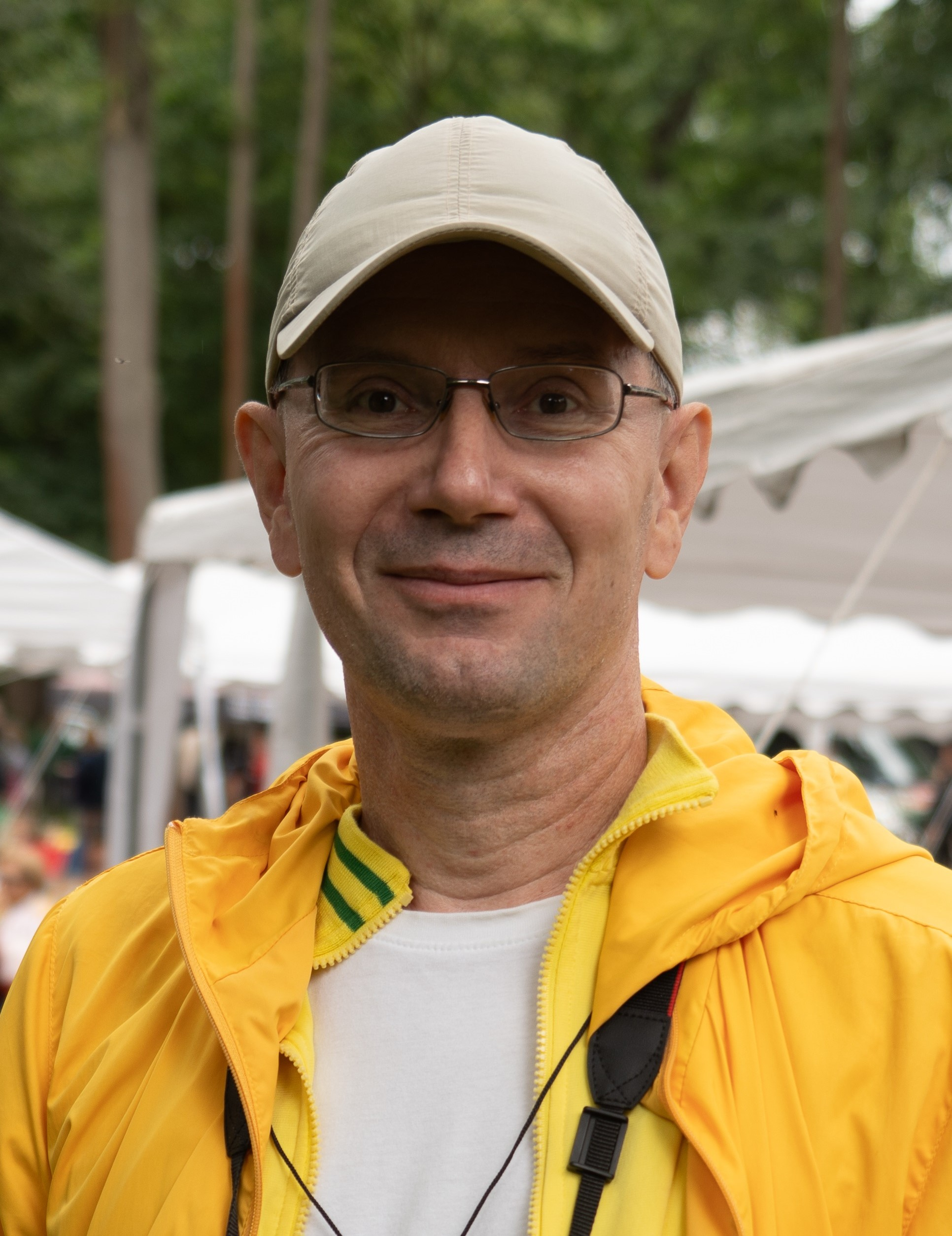
- Born: 25 July 1968 (age 58); Nowa Ruda, Poland
- Education: University of Wrocław
- Occupations: poet, cultural animator

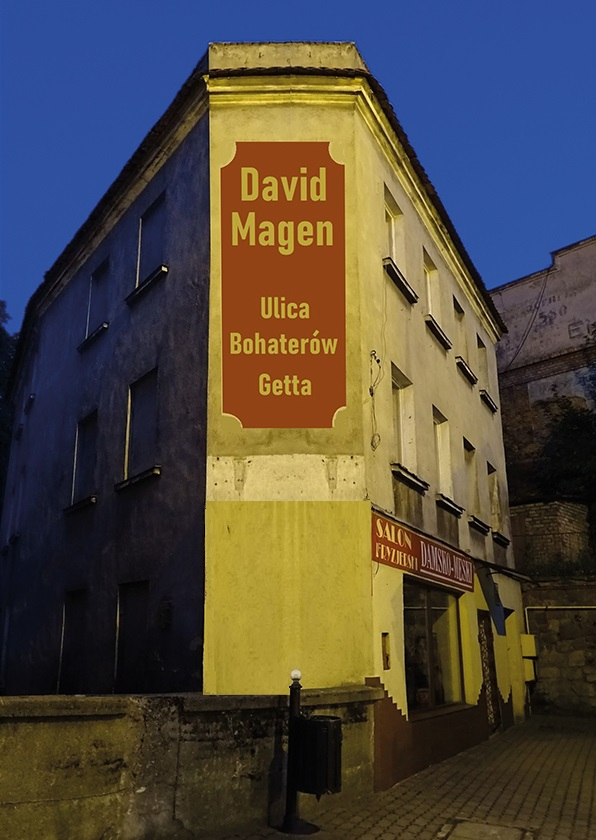
Ulica Bohaterów Getta. Wiersze wybrane

Tomasz Leśniowski (Ps. David Magen; born 25 Juli 1968) is a Polish poet and cultural animator.

== Life and work ==
Leśniowski was born on 25 July 1968 in Nowa Ruda. He graduated from the Stanisław Staszic Technical School in Nowa Ruda. Leśniowski studied at the University of Wrocław's and University of Opole. Co-founder of the Nowa Ruda Literary Club Ogma and of the Polish-Czech Group of Poets '97.

Co-organizer of Nowa Ruda Meetings with Poetry and Polish-Czech meetings of poets; juror of Polish poetry competitions and together with Karol Maliszewski and Olga Tokarczuk of the regional literary and journalistic competition „My Little Homeland". Author of five sheets and a volume of poetry. Co-editor or publisher of over 60 volumes and anthologies published in Nowa Ruda. Distinguished and awarded in national poetry competitions, e.g. them. Halina Poświatowska in Częstochowa. His poems have also appeared in numerous anthologies, including: imiona istnienia (Wrocław 1997), Almanach Wałbrzyski, Literatura, Fotografia (Wałbrzych 1997), V kouli (Prague 2003), Slovo Pády (Broumov 2008) and were translated into Czech and Russian.

== Books ==
=== Poetry ===
- na twym grobie, Noworudzki Klub Literacki Ogma, 1991
- Virginia, Abigail, Grupa Charytatywno-Kulturalna „Dziewięćsił”, 1995
- odłamek macewy, Cermait, Nowa Ruda, 1997
- niedziela w kłodzku, Polsko-Czeska Grupa Poeci '97, Nowa Ruda, 1998
- dzień mózgu Cermait-Grîanainech, Nowa Ruda, 2000
- Ulica Bohaterów Getta. Wiersze wybrane, Wydawnictwo Drukarnia Kokociński Sp. z o.o., Nowa Ruda, 2022, ISBN 978-83-66996-30-4.

=== History of culture ===
- Noworudzki Klub Literacki Ogma, Grupa Poeci ’97, Cermait-Grîanainech, Nowa Ruda, 1999
- Poeci Doskonale Wierni: Noworudzki Klub Literacki Ogma, Polsko-Czeska Grupa Poeci ’97 w latach 1900–2004, Karol Maliszewski (Foreword), Wydawnictwo „Maria”, 2005, ISBN 9788388842795.

=== Other ===
- Klimat społeczny domu dziecka, Wydawnictwo „Maria”, 2007, ISBN 9788360478363.
