= Antoni Matuszkiewicz =

Polish poet, prose writer, playwright, journalist

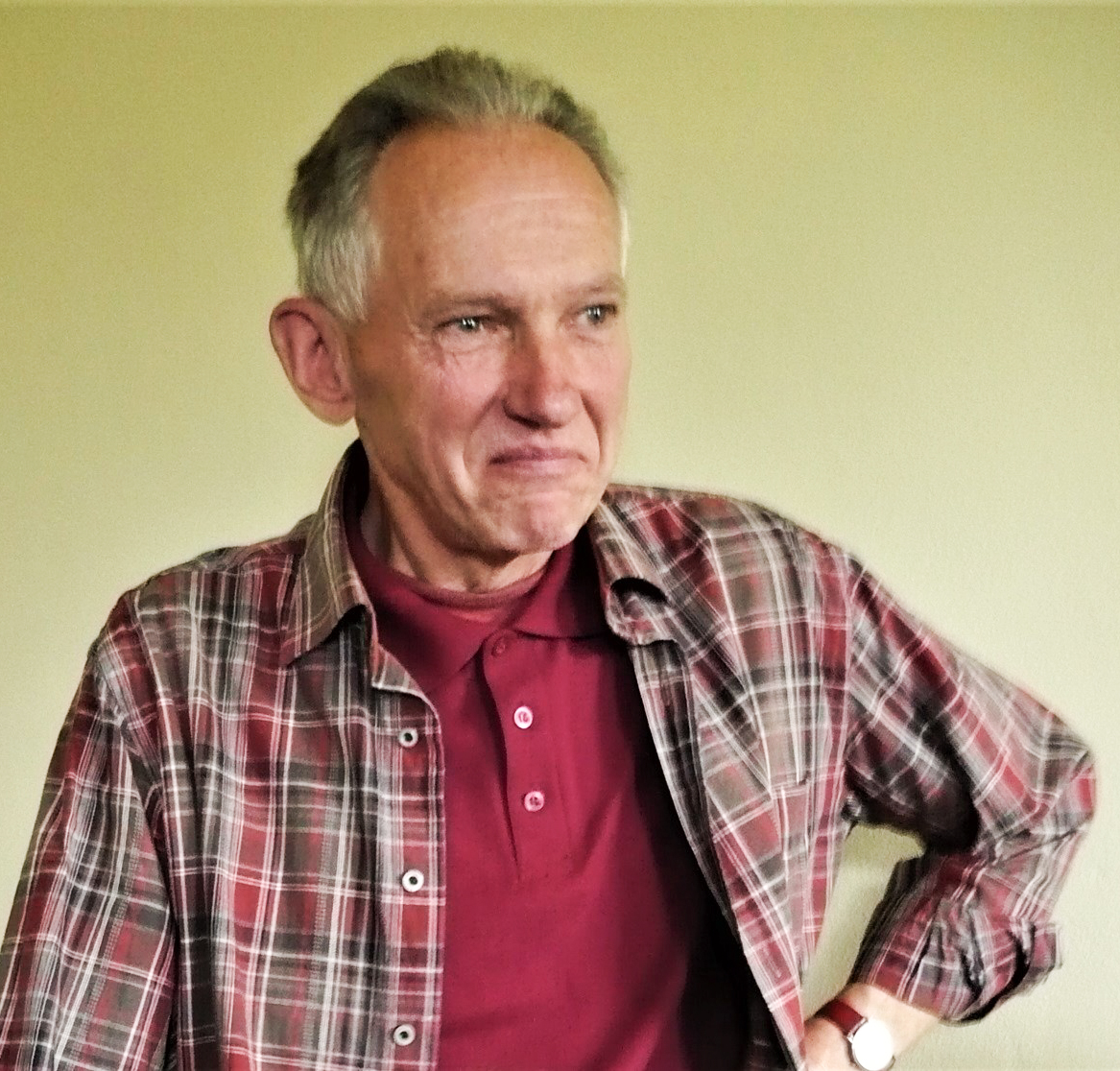
- Antoni Matuszkiewicz in 2009
- Born: 13 August 1945 (age 81); Lviv
- Education: University of Wrocław
- Known for: literature
- Awards: Order of Polonia Restituta, Cross of Freedom and Solidarity

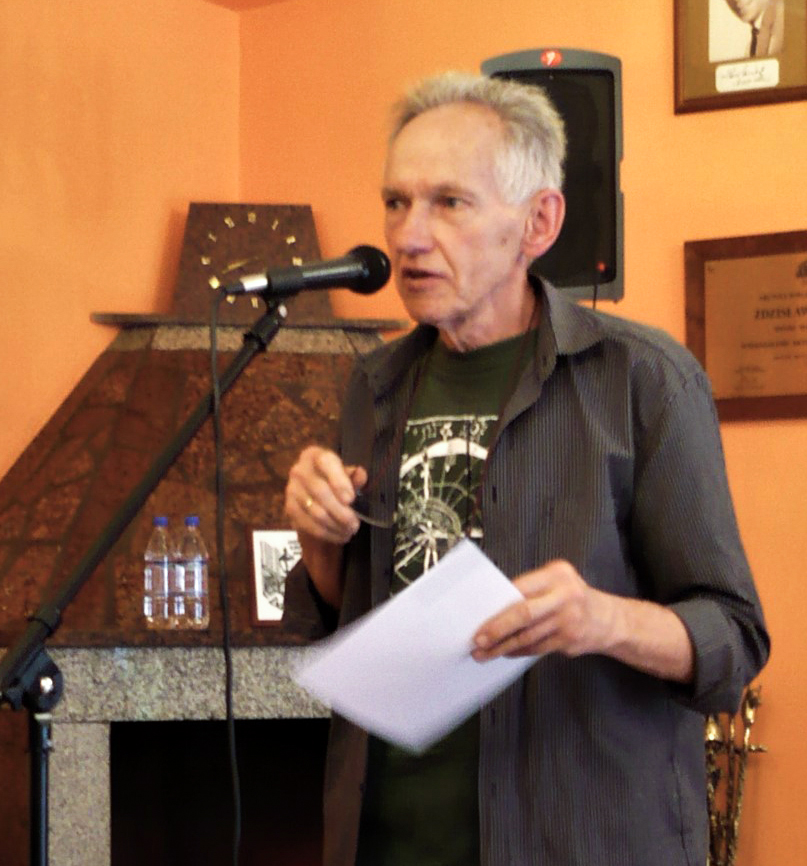
Antoni Matuszkiewicz in Nowa Ruda (2016)

Antoni Matuszkiewicz (born 13 August 1945) is a Polish poet, prose writer, playwright, journalist, and promoter of literary life. As a poet, he expresses himself in a modern and, at the same time, spiritual manner.

An opposition activist during the Polish People's Republic, he was interned on 13 December 1981. Associated with Świdnica, and later with the eastern part of the Kłodzko Land. Since 2008, he has been living in Martínkovice in the Czech Republic.

== Early life ==
He was born on 13 August 1945 in Lviv into a family of teachers. In April 1946, his parents Władysław and Maria née Alexandrowicz moved with him to Olesno in Opolian Silesia, where they lived until 1948, then to Świdnica, where Antoni graduated from the Jan Kasprowicz High School. From 1963 to 1968, he studied history at the University of Wrocław, while also participating in the Interdepartmental Cultural and Educational Studies, and was a member of Polish Students' Association. From 1961 to 1980, he was a voluntary guardian of monuments for Polish Tourist and Sightseeing Society.

From 1968 to 1970, he was the head of the collections department at the Cyprian Kamil Norwid Municipal Public Library in Świdnica. From 1971 to 1972, he was an instructor at the Świdnica Cultural Center. In 1976, he completed postgraduate studies in museology at the Jagiellonian University in Kraków. From 1973 to 1979, he worked at the Museum of Old Merchants in Świdnica; from 1976 as its director. From 1979 to 1982, he was the head of the scientific and educational department at the District Museum in Wałbrzych.

After the period of internment, he was released from the museum, and in 1982 he started working as a clerk at the Lower Silesian Graphic Works in Wałbrzych, then from 1983 to 1985 he worked as a laborer at the Galess candle factory in Świdnica; in 1985 he briefly worked at an antique shop. From 1987 to 1988, he was an instructor in the publishing department of the Provincial Center for Culture and Art "Książ Castle", and from 1989 to 1990, he was the deputy editor-in-chief of Niezależne Słowo.

After the Polish Round Table Agreement, the birth of the Third Polish Republic, and the political changes, he founded the Pluton Publishing House, of which he was the owner from 1991 to 1994. He published 20 books by authors associated with the region and classics of literature, including Sándor Petőfi, János Pilinszky, Kahlil Gibran. In 1995, he worked at the Association of Friends of Sick Children Serce in Świdnica.

In 1996, he moved from Świdnica to Stronie Śląskie, then after a year to Stary Gierałtów in the Golden Mountains, and since 2008, he has been living in Martínkovice near the Polish border, near Broumov in the Czech Republic.

== Social activism and activities in the opposition ==
From 1973, he was involved in the informal Club of Catholic Intelligentsia in Świdnica (registered as a branch of Club of Catholic Intelligentsia in Wałbrzych from 1983). In September 1980, he was a co-organizer of the Founding Committee of Solidarity at the District Museum, later becoming the chairman of the plant committee. In 1981, he was the founder, editor-in-chief, author, and organizer of the independent publication Niezależne Słowo (until December 1981), and also contributed to Solidarność Dolnośląska. As a member of the Lower Silesian Board of the Wałbrzych Region of Solidarity from 13 December 1981 to 26 February 1982, he was interned in isolation centers in Strzebielinek and Kamienna Góra. (Note: Decision on internment No. 535. Interned from 13 December 1981 to 26 February 1982 (IPN BU 1460/1). Places: from 14 December 1981 to 6 January 1982, O.O. Wejherowo, from 7 January 1982 to 26 February 1982, O.O. Kamienna Góra (IPN Wr 30/678).) In 1982, he was dismissed from his job, and from 1985 to 1987, he was unemployed. In 1989, he participated in the election campaign of the Solidarity Citizens' Committee.

For many years (until 1996 when he left Świdnica), he was a significant animator of literary life in Świdnica. He was involved in the Regional Society of the Świdnica Region, was an active member of the Association for the Sake of Man ITON, a member of the boards of ITON, the Association of Friends of the Biała Lądecka Valley Kruszynka in Nowy Gierałtów, and the Limestone Museum Association in Stara Morawa.

He was the guardian of the Świdnica Literary Club Logos. He promotes poets and writers, conducts poetry workshops, and provides introductions to the volumes of other poets. He translates Czech poets. He is a founding member of the Polish Writers Association. In the Kłodzko Land, he organized literary meetings as part of the Literary University. In the summer of 1999, he conducted a Literary Retreat on the Biała Lądecka river. From 1999 to 2000, he was the editor of the regional-artistic magazine Stronica Śnieżnicka published by the Union of Śnieżnickie Municipalities.

With Věra Kopecká, they have been co-organizers of Poetry Days in Broumov (Czech: Dny poezie v Broumově) for many years. At the 20th Poetry Days, they jointly published an anthology Pegas nad Broumovem, containing poems from participants of the Poetry Days from 2010 to 2019 (55 writers, mainly Czech, Slovak, and Polish, as well as from Bulgaria, Greece, Lithuania, Russia, Ukraine, and Vietnam), which were published in Czech, Slovak, and Polish. At the same time, seminars, meetings, and discussions were organized in Broumov, the Czech Republic (including Prague and Hradec Králové), and in Poland. The 22nd edition took place in 2021.

== Awards and honors ==
- Officer's Cross of the Order of Polonia Restituta (2021)
- Cross of Freedom and Solidarity (2022)
- Honorary Member of the Polish-Czech Group of Poets '97 (2001)
- John Paul II Honorary Award for outstanding contributions to promoting understanding and international cooperation in the spirit of Christianity – awarded by the Organizing Committee of the Polish-Czech Days of Christian Culture (2020)

== Works ==
In 1972, his poems were published for the first time in the monthly magazine Odra. He is the author of over thirty volumes of poetry, prose poetry, and dramas. He has also published almost a hundred articles, texts, and reviews in various periodicals including: Borussia (Olsztyn), Dialog (Warsaw), Format (Wrocław), Fraza (Rzeszów), Krasnogruda (Sejny), Tytuł (Gdańsk), W drodze (Poznań), Więź (Warsaw), and others.

Antoni Matuszkiewicz's poetry is meditative, full of emotions, sensitive to detail, to the human environment and nature. He often describes the space of encounter with God and examines the biblical and Christian tradition in a new, very personal theology.

Poet, writer, and literary critic Karol Maliszewski believes that Antoni Matuszkiewicz expresses himself in his own way (the poet of his own voice and one theme), avant-garde yet spiritually (as if a modern artist were trying to reconcile [...] inventive metaphor with something eternal, with something akin to mystical spiritual formation). Matuszkiewicz's poems constantly speak of love, yet:

Matuszkiewicz does not renounce the body. [...] In the volume from 1989, titled "New Year", not only does the naked female body shine through, at times it speaks with a full voice. The poet allows it to express itself.

An important feature of the poet's expression is the awareness of his Lviv roots and the ecumenical mythology of reconciliation between Poles, Ukrainians, and Jews. On the other hand, he follows the traces of the intertwining of Silesian cultures in their German, Czech, and Polish varieties, intrigued by the phenomenon of cultural proximity. He draws poetic realities from the neighborhood. Bielice ("the last village on the edge of the homeland"), Błędne Skały, Broumov, Gierałtów, Owl Mountains, Golden Mountains, Kłodzko, Nowa Ruda, Ślęża, Śnieżnik, and Wambierzyce are for the poet a reserve of locality open to universality.

=== Chosen works ===
Source: (Note: Full list of publications (including excerpts from works) on the ITON website.)

==== Poetry ====
- Tropy. Kolumb (in Polish). Wałbrzych: Wałbrzyski Klub Literacki ZLP; Wydział Kultury i Sztuki UW, Wałbrzyskie Ścieżki Literackie. 1979. OCLC 1260326955.
- Czyste powietrze (in Polish). Wrocław: Wydawnictwo Ossolineum. 1980. OCLC 69296955.
- Lżejsze od Ziemi (in Polish). Wrocław: Zakład Narodowy im. Ossolińskich. 1982. ISBN 978-83-04-01053-6.
- Rebeka (in Polish). Wałbrzych: Wojewódzkie Centrum Kultury i Sztuki Zamek Książ. 1988. OCLC 804624383.
- Nowy Rok (in Polish). Świdnica. 1989. OCLC 804455645.
- Spojrzeć najdalej (in Polish). Świdnica: Pluton. 1991. OCLC 834073617.
- Droga do Iwonicza (in Polish). Świdnica: Pluton. 1993. ISBN 978-83-900280-9-5.
- Eden (in Polish). Świdnica: Pluton. 1994. ISBN 978-83-85807-03-2.
- Vox celestis (in Polish). Wrocław: Polish Writers Association. 2000. ISBN 978-83-911706-2-5.
- Błękitne przeciwstawienie (in Polish). Illustrated by Józef Hałas. Nowa Ruda: Mamiko. 2001. ISBN 978-83-915155-1-8.
- Berberys. Wiersze dolnośląskie (in Polish). Wrocław: Oficyna Wydawnicza Atut. 2003. ISBN 978-83-89247-42-1.
- Wysokie kamienie (in Polish). Nowa Ruda: Wydawnictwo Ziemia Kłodzka. 2006. ISBN 978-83-60923-01-6.
- Arkusz bialski (z wierszy 1996–2006) (in Polish). Wrocław: Polish Writers Association. 2007. ISBN 978-83-89898-27-2.
- Opisanie małego świata (in Polish). Photographs by Agnieszka Ziembińska. Kraków: Wydawnictwo Miniatura. 2011. ISBN 978-83-7606-231-0.
- Piasek pokory (in Polish). Puszczykowo: Copia Studio Poland Mikołaj Rybczyński. 2014. OCLC 932208178.
- Ultima Tholen (in Polish and Czech). Translated by Kopecká, Věra. Nowa Ruda: Wydawnictwo Maria. 2014. ISBN 978-83-64868-07-8.
- Pod Wielką Sową. Echa z Gór Sowich (in Polish). With Věra Kopecká. Wrocław – Nowa Ruda: Ośrodek Kultury i Sztuki we Wrocławiu; Stowarzyszenie Komitet Obywatelski Ziemi Kłodzkiej. 2017. ISBN 978-83-65892-03-4.
- Wiersze o ziemi i niebie (in Polish). Kłodzko – Nowa Ruda: Kłodzkie Towarzystwo Oświatowe; Usługi Poligraficzne Bogdan Kokot vel Kokociński. 2017. ISBN 978-83-948803-4-7.
- "Wybór tekstów". Dyskurs. Pismo Naukowo-Artystyczne ASP we Wrocławiu (in Polish). 25: 254–275. 2018. ISSN 1733-1528.
- ...przeszłyby nad nami wody wezbrane (in Polish). Krzeszów: Parafia Wniebowzięcia Najświętszej Maryi Panny w Krzeszowie. 2022. ISBN 978-83-959553-3-4.
- Wieszczyna i okolice (in Polish). Krzeszów. 2023.

==== Dramas ====
- "Pokutny krzyż". Dialog (in Polish). 36 (1): 12–38. 1991. Award in the competition of the Ministry of Culture and Art and the Polish Theatre in Wroclaw in 1990, premiere at the Polish Radio Theatre
- "Pokaz mody". Dialog (in Polish). 37 (6): 51–55. 1992.
- Hotel Europa
- Monsignore
- Efekt
- Pan Sziwa, radio play broadcast by Radio Wrocław
- Efekt Dopplera (radio play) broadcast by Polskie Radio Rzeszów, 2nd award in Polskie Radio Rzeszów competition in 2001

==== Prose ====
- Góry Kamienne (in Polish). Kraków: Wydawnictwo Literackie. 1986. ISBN 978-83-08-01611-4.
- Dochodzenie (in Polish). Świdnica: Atena. 1998. ISBN 978-83-909844-0-7.
- Subatlantyk. Widziane ze Złotych Gór (in Polish). Bydgoszcz: Świadectwo. 2000. ISBN 978-83-87531-63-8.
- Znad Czarnego Wierchu (in Polish). Photographs by A. Matuszkiewicz and Věra Kopecká. Broumov: Świadectwo. 2015. ISBN 978-80-88040-05-7.
- Bezustanny. Wobec pisarstwa Mariana Jachimowicza. Waldenburgiana (in Polish). Wałbrzych: Powiatowa i Miejska Biblioteka Publiczna "Biblioteka pod Atlantami". 2016. ISBN 978-83-88257-32-2.

==== Editorial anthologies, interviews ====
- Cień serca (in Polish). Świdnica: Miejska Biblioteka Publiczne im. Cypriana Norwida; Urząd Miejski. 1995. OCLC 749848577.
- Almanach Wałbrzyski (in Polish). Wałbrzych: Wojewódzka Biblioteka Publiczna. 1997. ISBN 978-83-906776-4-4.
- Świadomość światła (in Polish). Illustrated by Alicja Szyszko-Bohusz-Dobosz. Świdnica: Fundacja Wspierania Inicjatyw Regionalnych. 2000. ISBN 978-83-913829-0-5.
- Pegas nad Broumovem. Antologie poezie účastníků Dnů poezie v Broumově 2010–2019 (in Czech). With Věra Kopecká. Broumov. 2019. ISBN 978-80-88040-46-0.

==== Selections of poems in foreign languages ====
- Básničky v zrcadle / Wiersze w lustrze (in Czech). With Věra Kopecká. Illustrated by Yola Rybczynska. Broumov: Město Broumov. 2009. ISBN 978-80-254-4297-5.
- Básně o zemi a nebi (in Czech). Translated by Kopecká, Věra. Nowa Ruda - Kłodzko: Kłodzkie Towarzystwo Oświatowe; Usługi Poligraficzne Bogdan Kokot vel Kokociński. 2017. ISBN 978-83-948803-5-4.
- Kopecká, Věra, ed. (2009). Nade mnou hluboké nebe (in Czech). Translated by Kopecká, Věra. Nowa Ruda - Kłodzko: Kłodzkie Towarzystwo Oświatowe; Usługi Poligraficzne Bogdan Kokot vel Kokociński. ISBN 978-80-254-4671-3.
- Ultima Tholen (in Czech). Translated by Kopecká, Věra. Nowa Ruda: Wydawnictwo Maria. 2014. ISBN 978-83-64868-07-8.
- Cesta do posvátného háje. Antologie polsko-českého příhraničí = Droga do Świętego Gaju. Antologia polsko-czeskiego pogranicza (in Czech). With Věra Kopecká. Nowa Ruda: Usługi Poligraficzne Bogdan Kokot vel Kokociński. 2016. ISBN 978-83-945665-9-3.

==== Guidebooks ====
- Muzeum Dawnego Kupiectwa w Świdnicy (in Polish). Świdnica: Muzeum Dawnego Kupiectwa. 1977. OCLC 835925370.
- Das Museum der Alten Kaufmannschaft in Świdnica (in German). Translated by Lysoń, Bożena. Photographs by Edward Wójcik and Ryszard Michalak. Świdnica: Muzeum Dawnego Kupiectwa. 1977. OCLC 74828393.
- Kościół św. Stanisława i św. Wacława w Świdnicy / Die Pfarrkirche st. Stanislaus und Wenzeslus in Schweidnitz (in German and Polish). Translated by Adler, Horst. Świdnica: Pluton. 1991. OCLC 812691498.
