= Marta Dymek =

Polish chef, vegan activist

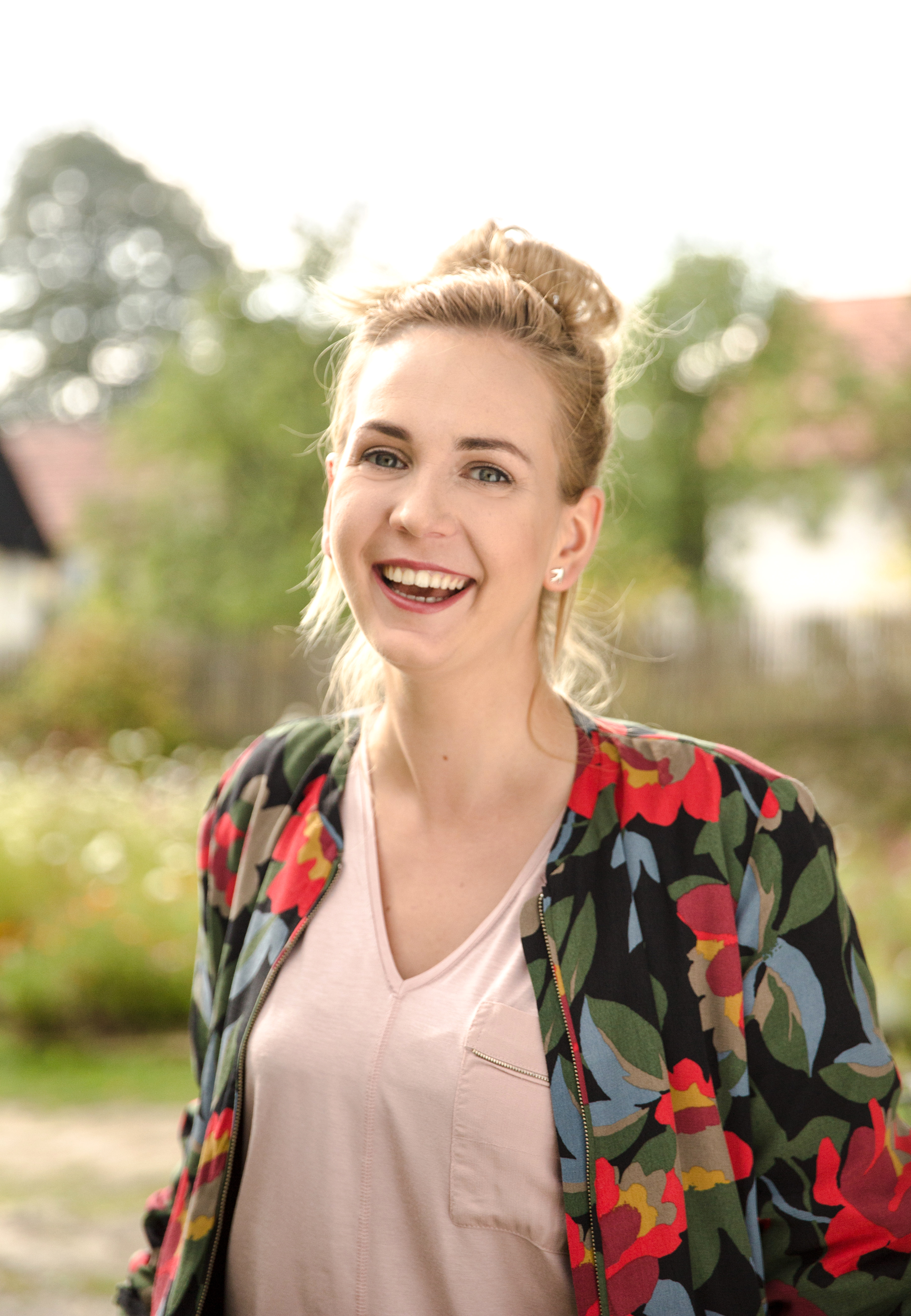
- Marta Dymek
- Born: 3 July 1990 (age 36); Wrocław, Poland
- Education: University of Wrocław
- Occupations: chef, cookbook author, blogger
- Years active: 2010–present
- Website: www.jadlonomia.com

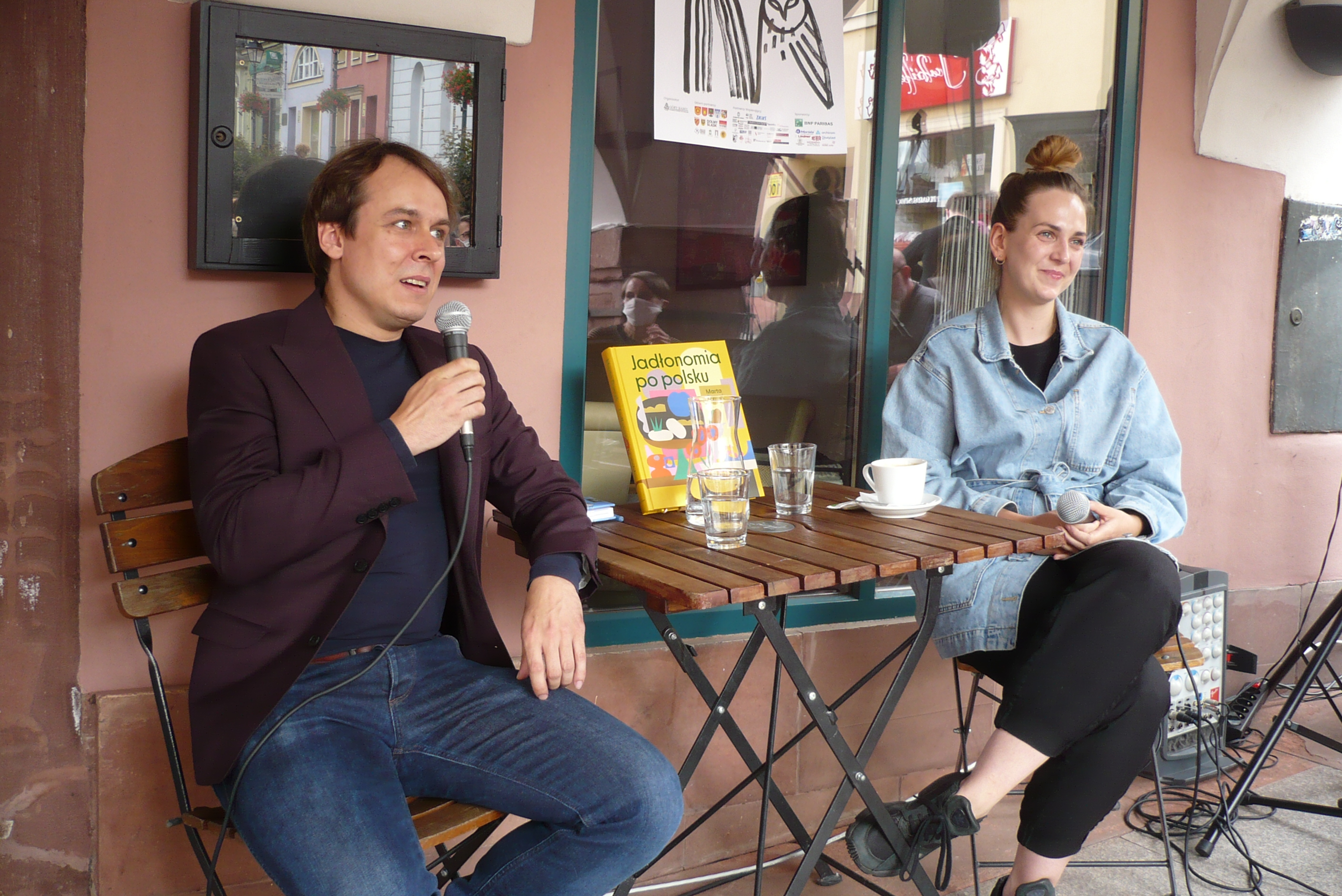
Zbigniew Fingas, Marta Dymek, Literary Heights Festival, Nowa Ruda, 2020

Marta Dymek ([ˈdɨmɛk]; born 3 July 1990) is a Polish chef, blogger, author of cookbooks, and an advocate for plant-based cooking.

== Early life ==
Dymek grew up in Wrocław, Poland. She attended the 14th High School in Wrocław, and graduated from the University of Wrocław, majoring in Interdisciplinary Individual Studies in Humanities and Social Sciences (Polish: Międzywydziałowe Indywidualne Studia Humanistyczne), as well as studying gender studies at the Institute of Literary Research of the Polish Academy of Sciences (Polish: Instytut Badań Literackich Polskiej Akademii Nauk). Upon completing her studies, she moved to Warsaw.

== Culinary work ==
In 2010, Dymek founded the culinary blog Jadłonomia, where she shares plant-based recipes. The title is a portmanteau of the Polish word jadło ('food') and the suffix -onomia ('-onomy'; as in ekonomia, 'economy'). In 2013, her blog won a national competition for Blog of the Year (Polish: Blog Roku) in the "Culinary" category. After receiving the award, she started publishing her recipes in the magazine Kuchnia, and shortly afterwards she published her first book Jadłonomia: 100 Recipes Not Only for Vegans. In September 2015, the book was presented as part of the Polish pavilion at Expo 2015. Within two years, the book sold over 250,000 copies. The publication has gone through six reprints and is still being reissued.

After publishing the book, Dymek began creating recipes and articles for the New York culinary quarterly Chickpea Magazine, Smak, Zwierciadło, Twój Styl, Kukbuk and Gazeta Wyborcza. She also received her own column in Kuchnia. In the following years, she was a regular contributor to Przekrój and Vogue Polska. In 2014, she started hosting her own vegan cooking program on Canal+ Kuchnia, titled Zielona Rewolucja (Green Revolution), which was the first full-length vegan cooking program in Poland. In 2018, the sixth season of the program was recorded in Thailand and is the first travel and culinary television program in Europe devoted entirely to vegan cuisine.

In the years 2015–2017, Dymek taught food studies at the SWPS University of Social Sciences and Humanities in Warsaw.

Dymek's blog has over a million views a month and has been regularly listed as the most influential Polish culinary blog for several years.

In 2017, Dymek published her second culinary book Nowa Jadłonomia: Plant-based recipes from around the world. The first printing of the book (30,000 copies) was exhausted within 10 days. In 2019, the book was published in Germany under the title Zufällig vegan (Coincidentally Vegan).

Dymek's third book Jadłonomia po polsku was published on 3 June, 2020.

== Views on veganism ==
Dymek is an ambassador of the Roślinnie Jemy (Let's Eat Plant-based) campaign, which is part of the Otwarte Klatki association. She is sympathetic to ideas of pragmatic veganism and effective altruism.

Since the beginning of her activity, Dymek has referred to her food as plant-based cuisine, emphasising that she wishes to encourage vegetarianism and veganism. When asked directly about veganism, she emphasizes the impact of intensive animal farming on the environment and refers to both ethical as well as ecological and environmental arguments.

== Publications ==
- Jadłonomia. 100 przepisów nie tylko dla wegan. (Jadłonomia: 100 Recipes Not Only for Vegans, Dwie Siostry, 2014)
- Nowa Jadłonomia. Roślinne przepisy z całego świata. (New Jadłonomia: Plant-based Recipes from Around the World, Marginesy, 2017)
- Jadłonomia po polsku. (Polish Jadłonomia, Marginesy, 2020)
