= Outstar =

Output of neural network

Outstar is an output from the neurodes of the hidden layer of the neural network architecture which works as an input for output layer. Neurode of hidden layer provides input to neurode of the output layer.
