= Norrman =

Norrman is a surname originating in Sweden. People with the name include:

- Fanny Norrman, pseudonym of Fanny Alving (1874–1955), Swedish poet and novelist
- G. L. Norrman (1846–1909), American architect
- Gunnar Norrman (1912–2005), Swedish graphic artist
- John Norrman (1884–1966), Swedish actor
- John O. Norrman (1929–2013), Swedish geographer and geomorphologist
- Ulf Norrman (1935–2020), Swedish Olympic sailor
- Vincent Norrman (born 1997), Swedish professional golfer
