= Dymek (surname) =

Dymek is a Polish surname. Notable people with the surname include:

- Jarek Dymek (born 1971), Polish strongman
- Marta Dymek (born 1990), Polish chef, author, and blogger
- Michał Dymek (born 1990 or 1991), Polish cinematographer
- Walenty Dymek (1888–1956), Polish Roman Catholic archbishop

== See also ==
- Dymek
