= Trauth =

Trauth is a surname, and may refer to:

- Andrew James Trauth (born 1986), American actor and musician
- Gero Trauth, German artist
- Denise M. Trauth, ninth president of Texas State University - San Marcos
- Louis Trauth, founder of Louis Trauth Dairy

== See also ==
- Eric Traut
- Hans Traut
