= Krzysztof Karwowski (poet) =

Polish poet and translator

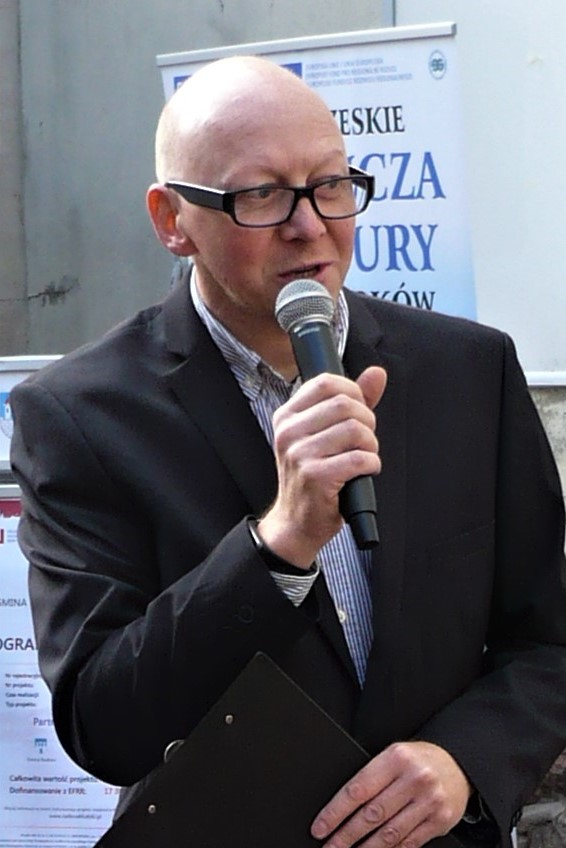
- Born: 14 July 1971 (age 55); Nowa Ruda, Poland
- Education: University of Wrocław
- Occupations: poet, translator

Krzysztof Karwowski (born 14 July 1971 in Nowa Ruda, Poland) is a Polish poet and translator.

Karwowski studied at the University of Wrocław's and University of Opole. Co-founder of the Polish-Czech Group of Poets '97 (Polish: Polsko-Czeska Grupa Poeci ’97), member of the Nowa Ruda Literary Club Ogma (Polish: Noworudzki Klub Literacki Ogma).

== Books ==
=== Poetry ===
- Obieg w naturze, Noworudzki Klub Litreacki Ogma, Nowa Ruda 1992
- Chlewy przywołują swoje świnie, Książnica Pomorska, Szczecin 1998
- H i Q, 1999, Nowa Ruda

=== Translations ===
- Hans Magnus Enzensberger: Nenia na jabłko, 1995
- Ingeborg Bachmann: Nocny rejs, 1997

=== Other (Culture theories) ===
- katAtonia wymiAru, Wydawnictwo Maria, Nowa Ruda 2001
- Tchnąć duszę, animacja na styku kultur, 2003
- Trójwymiar umysłu, Biblioteka Publiczna Miasta i Gminy, Radków 2010
