= Gero Trauth =

German painter

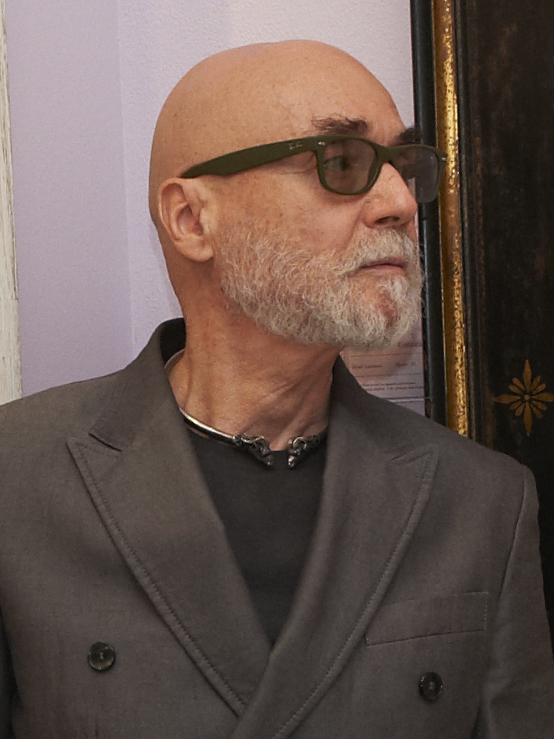
Gero Trauth (2012)

Gero Trauth (born 25 June 1942) is a German painter, graphic artist, porcelain illustrator and designer.

== Life and art work ==
Gero Trauth was born as a single child to Dr. med. Fritz Trauth and his wife Irene Jung in Neurode/Eulengebirge, Lower Silesia. In 1946 the family had to move to West Germany and settled in Siegen. Trauth is married to Renate Lohmann with two grown-up daughters.

=== Education ===
Trauth started his education in 1959 as a volunteer at the Buchkunst-Eggebrecht-Presse in Mainz led by Hans Schmidt. Then he studied Fine Arts, Graphics and Design at the Staatliche Werkkunstschule (today University of Applied Sciences, Mainz) from 1960 to 1965. His teachers were Gedo Dotterweich (1983-1986 president of the Deutscher Werkbund), Alfred Tilp, Heinz Müller-Olm (sculpture), Aloys Ruppel (history of calligraphy and books at the Johannes-Gutenberg-University), Helmut Presser (director of the Gutenberg Museum, history of book illustration). The studies were completed by seminars given by Heinz Mack (ZERO Lichtraum), Herbert W. Kapitzki and Anton Stankowski. In 1965, Trauth graduated with honors and gave a special exhibition at the Staatliche Werkkunstschule Mainz for a delegation of the ministry of Rheinland-Pfalz.

=== Tutors and friends ===
In 1962 Trauth met Bjørn Wiinblad through the help of designer Elsa Fischer-Dreyden. During his studies, Trauth frequently stayed in Copenhagen and Wiinblad became his artistic tutor and later his friend.

Trauth also became close friends with the Swedish painter and graphic-designer Gunnar Norrman († 2005) and his wife Ulla. They often visited each other and worked together at the same artistic printing press for copper gravure.

=== Art works ===
==== Painting and design ====
Since 1966, Trauth has been working as an independent painter and designer in his studio in Siegen. In 1972 he designed and built his private house. From 1967 to 1983 his works include sketches, graphics and sculptures for internationally famous art galleries such as Artes - Kunst unserer Welt 1982-1989, ars mundi - die Welt der Kunst 1982/1983 (release of the sculpture “Du” (You) both in a bronze and a marble version as well as posters and oil paintings. Trauth published two illustrated books entitled Verschollene Gärten (Forgotten Gardens) and Mein Herz ist ein Stern - Bilder wie Träume und Märchen (My heart is a star). His work as a designer ranges from ceramic tiles (Staatliche Majolika Manufaktur, Karlsruhe), fabric designs (Stuttgarter Gardinenfabrik, Taunus Textildruck), lamps (Bundesgartenschau Dortmund, Ambiente Messen Frankfurt a.M.), cutlery (department store GUM), pottery (Eternit AG) ceramic and stainless steel ornaments for public buildings as well as furniture designs. In 2000 he opened an exhibition house in Siegen (Gero-Trauth-Haus).

==== Illustrations on porcelain ====
In 1984 he began what was to be an extremely successful partnership with Villeroy&Boch/Heinrich–Porzellan in Selb which ended in 1997. During this time Trauth left his mark decisively on the range of products. The exclusive table settings and dinnerware were looked after by Trauth and Paloma Picasso whose objet d’art (collectors’ piece) “Paloma Picasso-Suite de Vase” was decorated by Trauth. Moreover, he designed bone china dinner services (Vie Sauvage, Arabian Fantasy und Happy Seasons). Numerous articles show his style, among others the exclusive objet d’art (collectors’ piece) “Magnum” (1990).

Trauth also created series of porcelain for the WWF (Symbiose Mensch – Natur, 1990) and the German Cancer Research (Deutsche Krebshilfe; (Träumereien, 1995). Moreover, series of Russian fairy tale motifs (Zaubermärchen aus dem Alten Rußland, Märchen der Wolga, Die Träume der Katharina) were created as well as other series (Zauberwelt der Manege, Liebespaare der Weltliteratur), annual Christmas plates, which were presented in Europe (Internationale Frankfurter Messen) and in the USA (Southbend-Fair, Chicago), V&B, Madison Avenue, New York.

==== Cappella Gero Trauth ====
In 2003 the new exhibition showroom Cappella Gero Trauth was designed by Trauth. It stands for the symbiosis of works from the world literature and Trauth's art works and is thought to be a refuge for his collectors.

2005 : Vernissage and exhibition of water-color graphics on Heinrich Heine’s Buch der Lieder (Book of Songs, 1827)

2008 : Vernissage and exhibition of oil paintings and graphics on Alexander Ostrovsky's Snegurochka (The Snow Maiden or Snowflake)

2012 : Vernissage and exhibition of oil paintings and graphics on “Ich bin so wild nach deinem Erdbeermund”: Nymphs

2013 : Vernissage and exhibition of oil paintings and graphics on “Indische Märchenwelt” (graphical interpretations of the Gita Govinda, Song of Govinda)

=== Awards and recognitions ===
- 1957 Winner of a competition of the magazine “Stern” entitled self-portraits (January 12, 1957).
- 1964 Design award (gift wrapping) by the Swedish company Åkerlund & Rausing.
- 1969 Seven Design Awards “Die gute Form” for company products at the International Frankfurt Trade Fair.
- 1990 Trauths collectors’ pieces on porcelain were entered in and exhibited by the Museum of Ceramics in Mettlach.
- 2004 Alle unsere Träume (All our Dreams) accepted by the Museum of the Royal Academy of Music, Foyle Menuhin Archive (Nr. 2005.2566), London.
- 2006 Trauth's 32 graphics on Heinrich Heine's “Book of Songs” were accepted by the Heinrich-Heine-Institut in Düsseldorf.

== Bibliography ==
- Verschollene Gärten - ein Bildband (Lost Gardens – a book of paintings), Rettmer und Luy, Karlsruhe 1979, 2. Edition 1982
- Mein Herz ist ein Stern - Bilder wie Träume und Märchen, ein Bildband (My Heart is a Star – Paintings like Dreams and Fairytales), Im Haus der Sterne 1998, ISBN 3-00-002785-8
- Das Buch zum Buch der Lieder - Illustrations of Heinrich Heines Buch der Lieder, Cappella Gero Trauth 2006
- Das Buch zum Schneeflöckchen - Illustrations of Alexander Ostrowskis Sneguročka/Schneeflöckchen, Cappella Gero Trauth 2009

=== Collector lists and encyclopedias ===
- Listed in Collector Editions/Spring 1986, Collector Communications-Corp, NY.
- Listed in Plate World (Who's Who among Artists) (1987).
- Listed in The Bradford Book of Collector's Plates (1988).
- A.-A. Ziese Allgemeines Lexikon der Kunstschaffenden in der bildenden und gestaltenden Kunst im ausgehenden XX. Jahrhundert, Bd. 2, Nr. 82005, Verlag arte factum, Nürnberg (1986/87).
