= Nowa Ruda Literary Club Ogma =

Polish group of poets

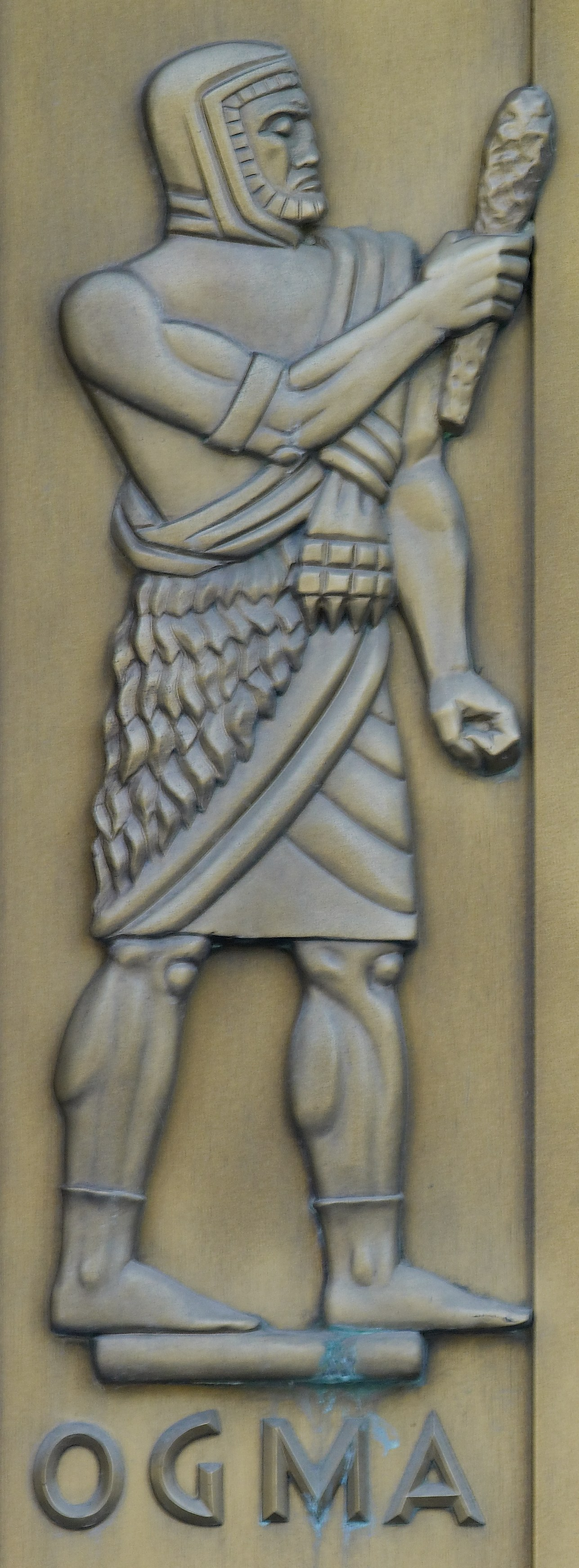
Ogma

Nowa Ruda Literary Club Ogma (Polish: Noworudzki Klub Literacki Ogma) was a Polish group of poets founded in 1990 by Lidia Bryk-Mykietyn, Daniel Gwoździk, Adam Kandefer, Bogdan Klim, Tomasz Leśniowski and Karol Maliszewski in Nowa Ruda, Poland.

The patron of the club was the god of Irish and Scottish mythology Ogma, the inventor of Ogham.

The club became the Polish-Czech Group of Poets '97.

== Members ==
Sebastian Antolik, Lidia Bryk-Mykietyn, Weronika Gawrońska, Jarosław Grzeszyk, Daniel Gwoździk, Beata Jaroszewska, Kornelia Jaroszewska, Jakub Jóźwicki, Adam Kandefer, Krzysztof Karwowski, Bogdan Klim, Adam Korzeniowski, Magdalena Kotwica, Małgorzata Krzyżanowska, Bolesław Kubicki, David Magen, Karol Maliszewski, Ewa Marciniak, Lidia Niekraś, Angelika Niepsuj, Aneta Oczkowska, Tomasz Proszek, Beata Rumak-Eisfeld, Edmund Rychlewski, Bogusław Sobótka, Marek Sudoł, Anna Szpak, Renata Szymik, Karolina Trybała, Daniel Wielgus, Sylwia Wierdak, Sebastian Wojdyła.

== Books ==
- "Antologia Klubu Młodych Literatów Ogma. Zeszyt 1", 1990
- "Antologia Poezji NKL Ogma. Zeszyt II", 1990
- "Mała Antologia Ogmy", 1990
- Karol Maliszewski "Będę przebywał jeszcze wtedy w Polsce", 1991
- Daniel Gwoździk "ujarzmione części świata", 1991
- "Antologia Poezji. Zeszyt III", 1991
- David Magen "na twym grobie", 1991
- "Antologia Poezji. Zeszyt IV", 1991
- Anthology "pod powiekami z rozsypanych słów", 1992
- Beata Jaroszewska "jakaś dziwna radość", Anna Szpak "gubiąc echo własnych słów", 1992
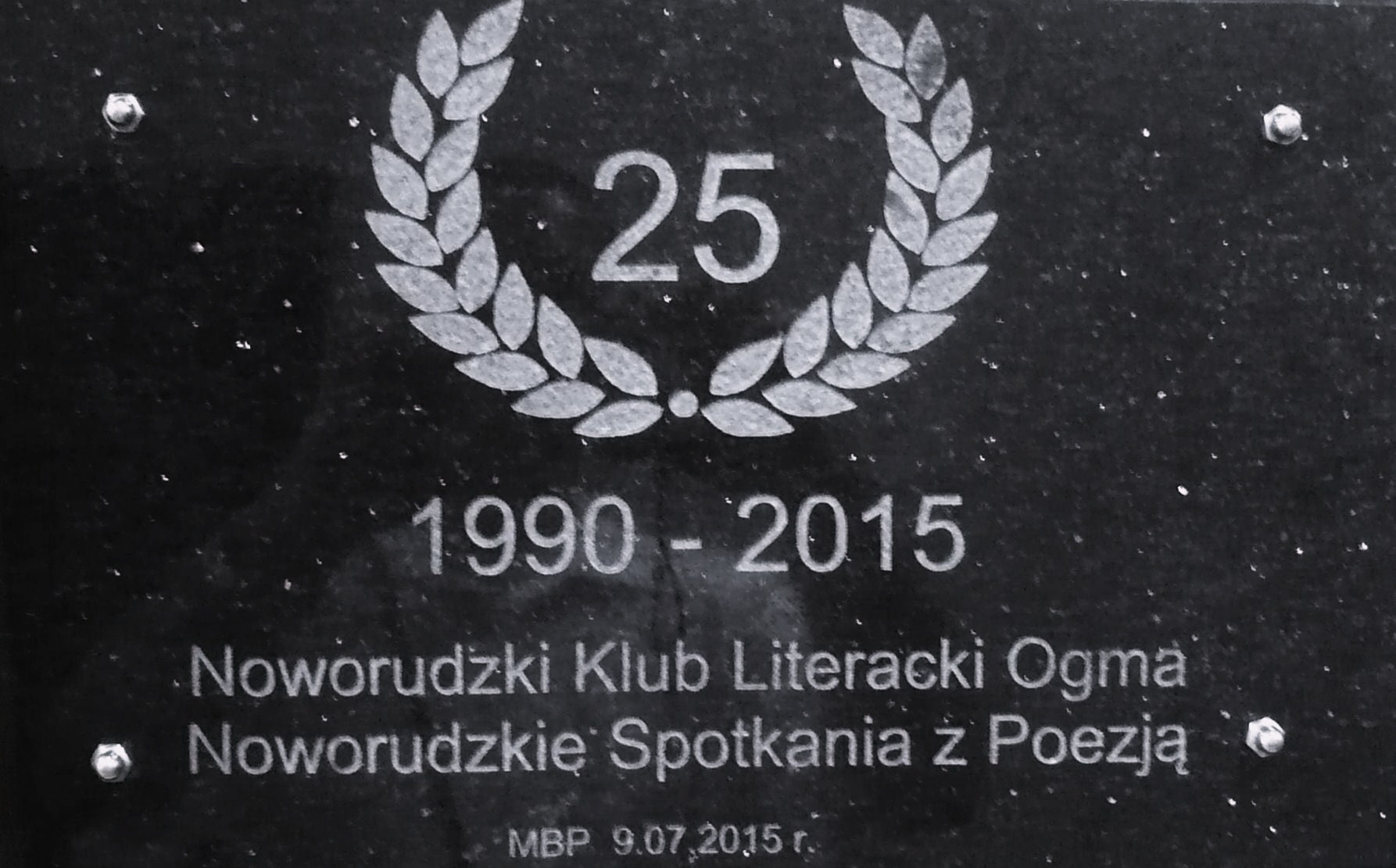
  Memory board
- Anthology "pożegnanie z poezją", 1992
- Zygmunt Krukowski "Kosztowna esencja", 1993
- Anthology "Dzieciom światłości", 1994
- Anthology "Pióro Cię nie wypowie", 1994
- Anthology "Języki drzew", 1994
- David Magen "Virginia Abigail", 1995
- Krzysztof Karwowski "Obieg w naturze", 1995
- "Wybierz sobie gwiazdę", 1995
- Anthology "niech się dzieje wola słowa", 1995
- Hans Magnus Enzensberger "Nenia na jabłko". Translations K. Karwowski, 1995
- "13 Antologia Poezji", 1995
- Przemysław Jurek "Demo", 1995
- Zygmunt Gorazdowski "Wiersze pozostające", 1995
- Anthology "Jak przed podróżą", 1996
- Anthology "Gdzie indziej", 1997
- Beata Jaroszewska "On mieszka w drzewach", 1997
- Anthology "tak sentymentalni", 1998
- Aneta Oczkowska "delikatność traw", 1998
- Anthology "Równoległe światy", 1998
- Anthology "nie jedyne nie wszystko", 1999
- Anthology "Miejsce między nami", 2000
- Anthology "Wyścig z czasem", 2000
- Renata Szymik, Bolesław Kubicki "Wiersze. Pierwsza dekada października", 2000
- Anthology "patrzeć na siebie bez alfabetu", 2001
- Anthology "Wyrwane z krwiobiegu", 2002
- Anthology "Między granicą światów", 2003
- Anthology "Nazwij to snem", 2004
- Anthology "poezja mój oddech", 2005
- Anthology "Cząstki języka", 2006
- Anthology "Daj głos, dołącz do reszty", 2007
- Anthology "wiersz wyszedł z domu", 2008
- Anthology "Zaimki świata – Nowa Ruda", 2009
- Anthology "Skądkolwiek, gdziekolwiek", 2010
- Anthology "Luźne drwa", 2014 ISBN 978-83-62337-92-7
- Anthology "opisz to/ zostań po sobie", 2015,ISBN 978-83-941560-5-3
- Anthology "do podawania na zimno", 2016,ISBN 978-83-944773-6-3
- Anthology "rzeźbienie z ognia", 2017, ISBN 978-83-948259-3-5
- Anthology "najpiękniej najprościej", 2018,ISBN 978-83-950307-7-2
- Anthology "coś mi się rymuje z", 2019, ISBN 978-83-954998-9-0
- Anthology "Pewnego dnia nazwiemy wszystko od nowa", 2020, ISBN 978-83-959354-7-3
- Anthology "śpiewać piosenki na ulicy", 2021, ISBN 978-83-66996-14-4
- David Magen "Ulica Bohaterów Getta. Wiersze wybrane", 2022, ISBN 978-83-66996-30-4
- Anthology "Ucieszyło mnie ich zmartwychwstanie", 2022, ISBN 978-83-66996-48-9
- Anthology "z najważniejszych rzeczy", 2023, ISBN 978-83-66996-63-2
