= Polish-Czech Group of Poets '97 =

Polish poets group

Polish-Czech Group of Poets '97 (Polish: Polsko-Czeska Grupa Poeci ’97) was a Polish group poets founded in 1997 by Krzysztof Karwowski and Tomasz Leśniowski in Nowa Ruda (Poland).

The founders of the group were people who created the output of the Nowa Ruda Literary Club Ogma: anthologies and volumes, as well as interesting artistic and poetic events. The group focused on more intensive publishing activity and maintained mutual contacts, mainly by correspondence. The inspiration for this transformation were the words from Karol Maliszewski's poem "Perfectly Faithful Poets": "They will write something else / in 1997 you will hear about them / the resurrection of the poem will be announced".

== Members ==
Elżbieta Antoś, Lidia Bryk-Mykietyn, Magda Gazur, Daniel Gwoździk, Miloš Hromádka (Czech Republic), Krzysztof Karwowski, Marek M. Kielgrzymski, Bogdan Klim, Věra Kopecká (Czech Republic), Piotr Wiktor Lorkowski, David Magen, Karol Maliszewski, Antoni Matuszkiewicz, Lidia Niekraś, Aneta Oczkowska, Mariusz Poźniak, Tomasz Proszek, Beata Rumak-Eisfeld, Anna Szpak, Renata Szymik, Karolina Trybała (Germany).

== Books ==
- Ingeborg Bachmann „Nocny rejs”. Translations K. Karwowski, 1997
- Anthology „Wiersze dla kilku przyjaciół”, 1997
- David Magen „odłamek macewy”, 1997
- Anthologie „miasto poetów”, 1997
- Mariusz A. Poźniak „Senne podróże”, 1997
- David Magen „niedziela w kłodzku”, 1998
- Władysław Krupa „Wiersze niektóre”, 1998
- Anthology „Szklany parnas”, 1998
- Katarzyna Brzóska „Kolory na środku”, 1999
- „Noworudzki Klub Literacki Ogma. Grupa Poeci '97”, 1999
- David Magen „Dzień mózgu”, 2000
- Krzysztof Karwowski, „HiQ”, 2000
