= Literary Heights Festival =

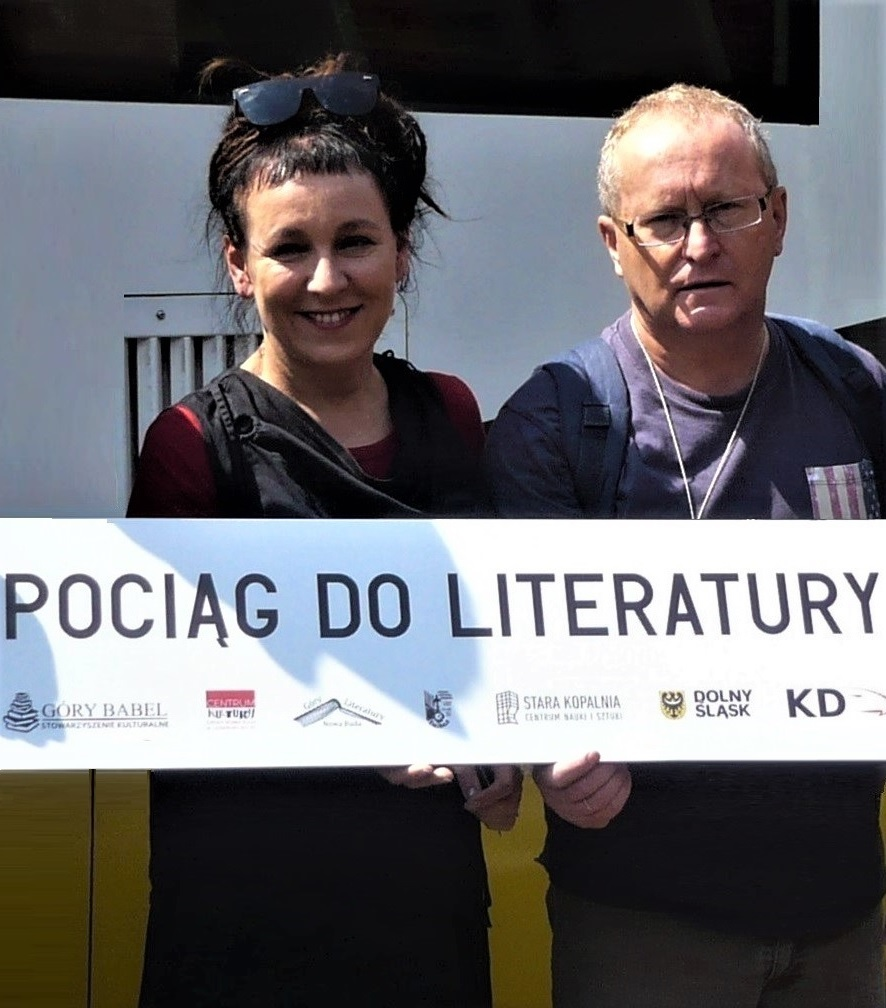
Olga Tokarczuk and Karol Maliszewski at the 2018 edition of the festival

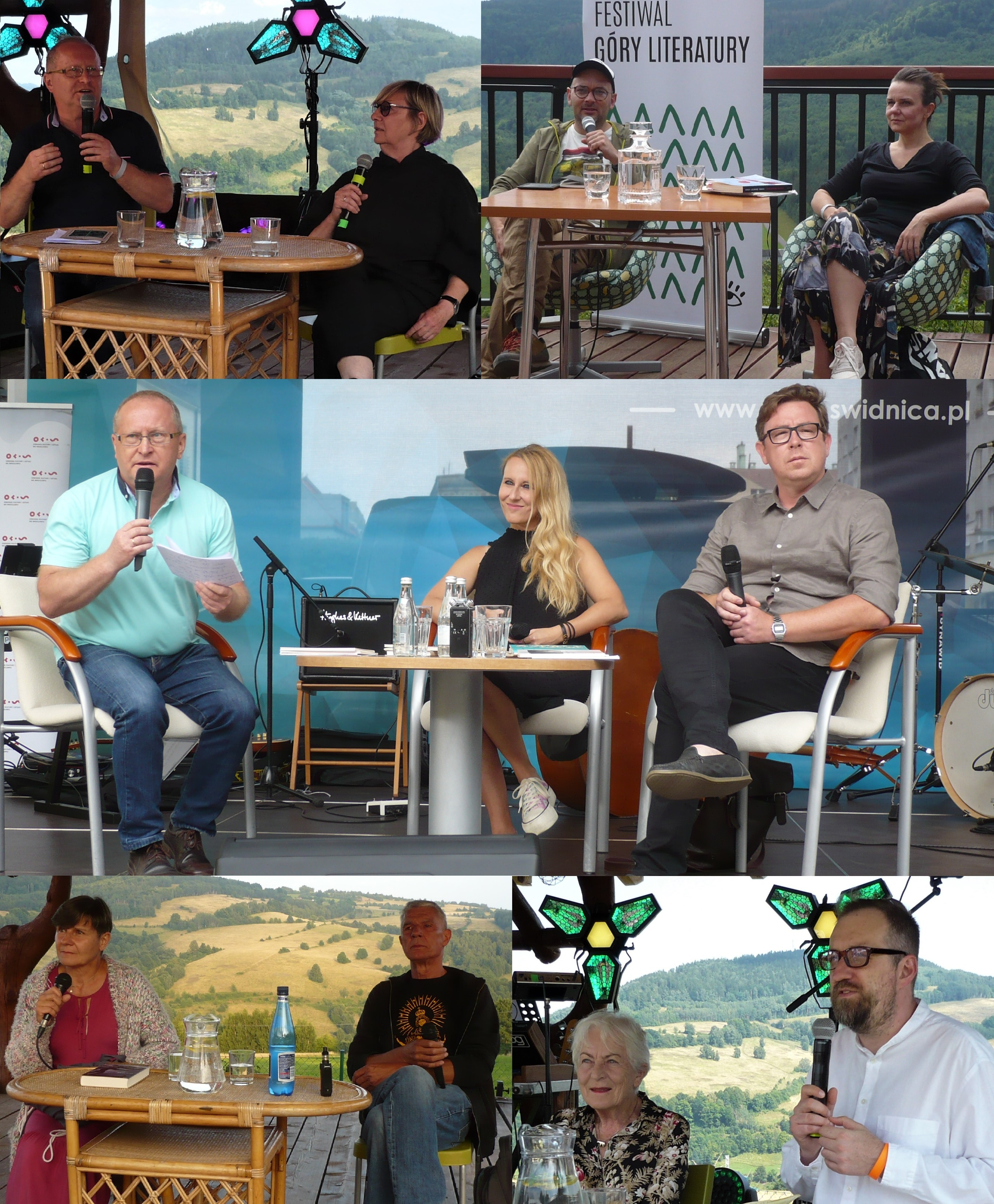
Literary Heights Festival, 2021

The Literary Heights Festival (Polish: Festiwal Góry Literatury) is a Polish literary festival founded in 2015 which takes place in the vicinity of Nowa Ruda at the foot of the Owl Mountains in the Kłodzko Valley.

The event's organizers include the Olga Tokarczuk Foundation, the city and commune of Nowa Ruda, while the hosts are Karol Maliszewski and Olga Tokarczuk. The festival's program includes educational sessions, debates, concerts, panels, shows, meetings, poetry, literary workshops, film screenings, culinary workshops and various exhibitions.
