= Karol Maliszewski =

Polish poet and literary critic

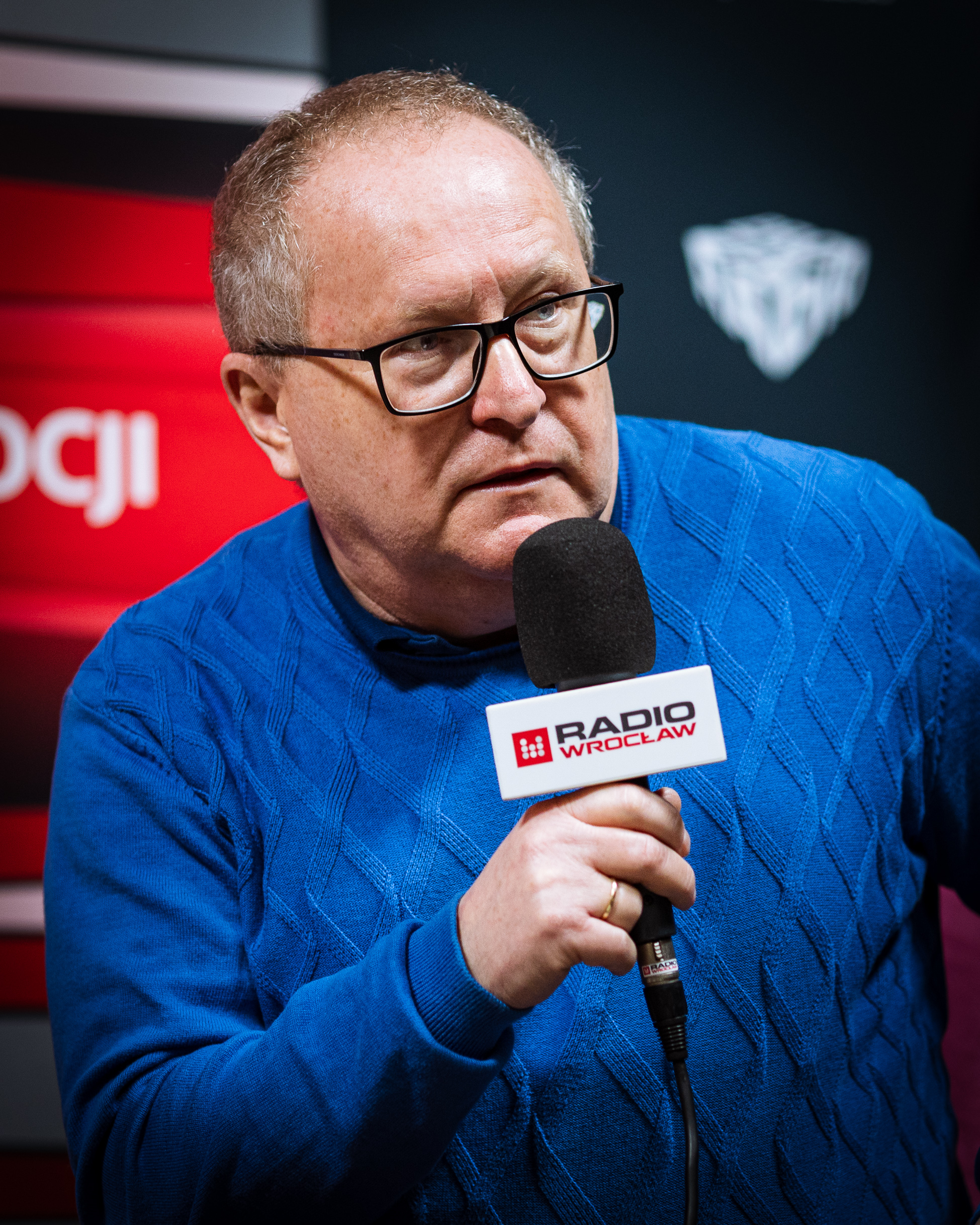
- Maliszewski in 2025
- Born: 27 July 1960 (age 66); Nowa Ruda, Poland
- Education: University of Wrocław
- Occupations: poet, translator, writer, literary critic, literary scholar

Karol Maliszewski (born 27 July 1960) is a Polish poet, prose writer, literary critic and literary scholar. He is habilitated doctor – professor at the University of Wrocław.

== Life and work ==
Maliszewski was born on 27 July 1960. He graduated from the Henryk Sienkiewicz High School in Nowa Ruda, where he excelled in Humanities. Karol Maliszewski made his debut as a poet in 1978 in the monthly Radar. Maliszewski studied at the University of Wrocław's and University of Opole. Co-founder of the Nowa Ruda Literary Club Ogma, member of the Polish-Czech Group of Poets '97. In 1993 he became a member of the Stowarzyszenie Pisarzy Polskich. In 2001, he started conducting poetry workshops at the Jagiellonian University in Kraków. Since 2015, Karol Maliszewski and Olga Tokarczuk have been the hosts of Literary Heights Festival, organized by the Olga Tokarczuk Foundation. He published his poems and reviews in the following magazines: Akant, Arkusz, Borussia, Czas Kultury, FA-art, Fraza, Kresy, Nowa Okolica Poetów, Nowy Nurt, Odra Opcje, Pomosty, Pracownia, Pro Libris, Red., Res Publica Nowa, Studio, Studium, Sycyna, Topos, Twórczość, Tygodnik Powszechny, Wersja. He lived in Nowa Ruda.

== Books ==
=== Poetry ===
1. Dom i mrok, 1985
2. Wiersz wolny, 1987
3. Miasteczko – prośba o przestrzeń, 1988
4. Będę przebywał jeszcze wtedy w Polsce, 1991
5. Młody poeta pyta o-, 1994, ISBN 83-901319-1-9
6. Rocznik sześćdziesiąty grzebie w papierach, 1996
7. Rok w drodze, 2000
8. Inwazja i inne wiersze, 2004
9. Na obou stranách, 2005
10. Zdania na wypadek. Wiersze wybrane, 2007
11. Potrawy pośmiertne, 2010
12. Ody odbite, 2012
13. Jeszcze inna historia. Wiersze wybrane, 2015
14. Przypadki Pantareja. Wiersze dla małych i dużych, 2017
15. [małe zawsze], 2017
16. Piosenka o przymierzaniu, 2019
17. Silnik na trawie, 2022, ISBN 978-83-65502-68-1
18. List do prawnuków, 2024, ISBN 978-83-6715-26-62

=== Prose ===
1. Dziennik pozorny, 1997
2. Próby życia, 1998
3. Faramucha, 2001
4. Sajgon, 2009
5. Manekiny, 2012
6. Przemyśl-Szczecin, 2013
7. Ludzie stąd, 2017
8. Szpok. Próby, 2020 ISBN 978-83-955516-6-6
9. Czarownica nad Włodzicą. Baśnie z i legendy z Nowej Rudy i okolic, illustrations Tatiana Tokarczuk, 2021
10. Diabeł z Wilkowca. Baśnie z i legendy z okolic Nowej Rudy, 2023
11. Udar w ministerstwie wyjaśnień, coauthor Jarek Łukaszewicz, 2024

=== Criticism ===
1. Nasi klasycyści, nasi barbarzyńcy. Szkice o nowej poezji, 1999
2. Zwierzę na J. Szkice o wierszach i ludziach, 2001
3. Nowa poezja polska 1989–1999. Rozważania i uwagi, 2005
4. Rozproszone głosy, 2006
5. Po debiucie. Dziennik krytyka, 2008
6. Z dolnośląskiej półki: szkice o literaturze regionalnej, 2008
7. Pociąg do literatury. Szkicownik literacki z Dolnego Śląska, 2010
8. Wolność czytania. Teksty z przypisami i bez, 2015
9. Poezja i okolice. Między krytyką literacką a historią literatury, 2018
10. Bez zaszeregowania. O nowej poezji kobiet, 2020
11. Język w ogniu i inne metafory krytycznoliterackie, 2022

=== Textbooks ===
1. Jak zostać pisarzem, 2011

=== Translations ===
1. Jiří Červenka, Na obou stranách, 2005
2. Jiří Červenka, Teoria przekładu. Wiersze stare i nowe, 2016

== Rewards ==
- them. Marek Jodłowski, 1994
- them. Barbara Sadowska, 1998
- them. Ryszard Milczewski-Bruno, 1999
- nomination for Nike Literary Award, for Rozproszone głosy, 2006.
