= Gunnar Norrman =

Swedish graphic artist

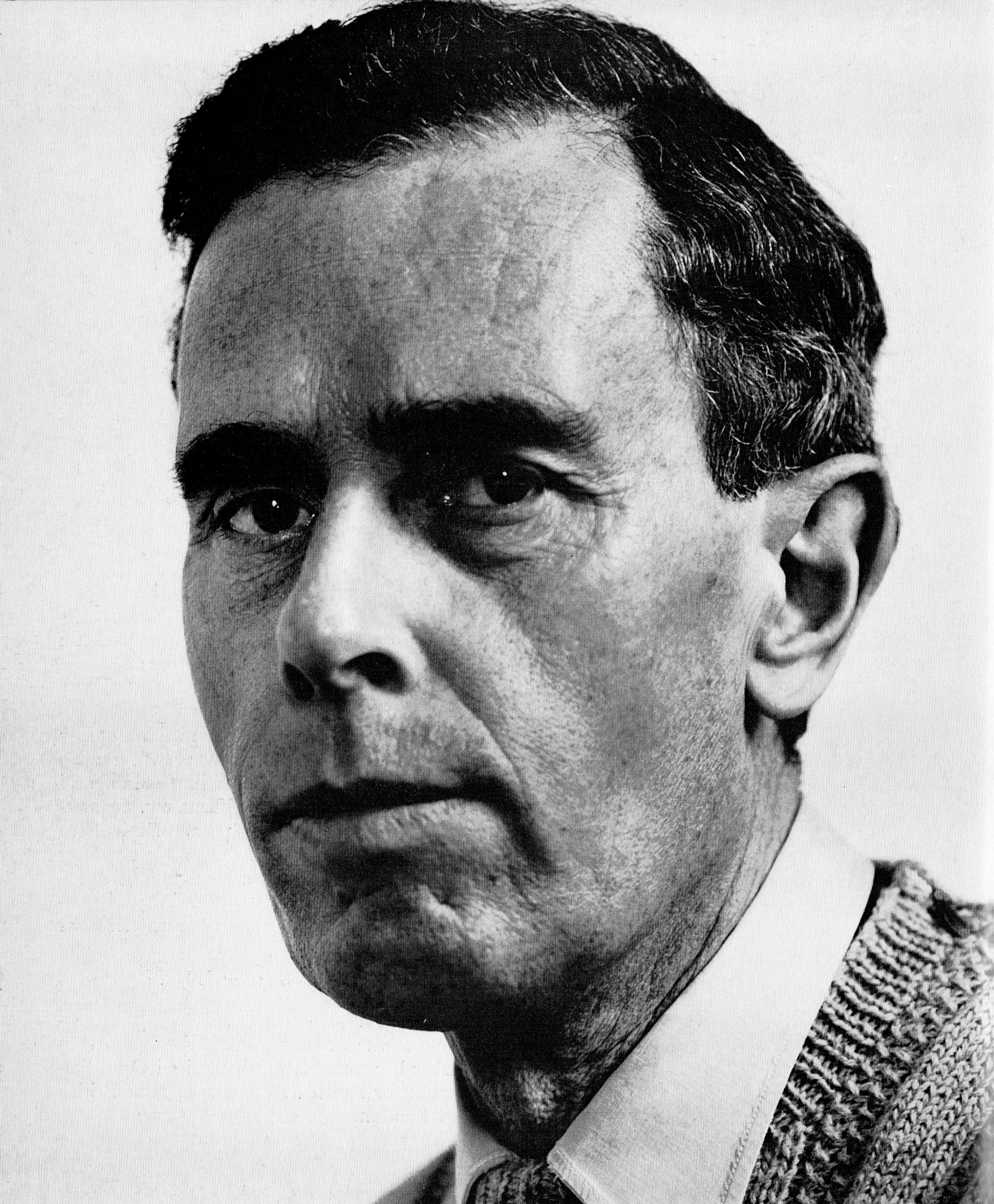
Gunnar Norrman

Gunnar Norrman (1912, Malmö – 2005, Lomma) was a Swedish graphic artist.

The only formal education in the arts that Gunnar Norman received was a three-month long course in printmaking in 1941. He also studied botany extensively and trained to become a concert pianist. The first exhibition of Norrman's work was in his hometown Malmö in 1942. During his entire career, he produced only black and white prints and drawings, often with themes from nature. One of his American gallerists described his style thus: "His subjects are filled with silence conveying the Oriental tradition of reverence and humility before nature, a strong theme in the artist’s life. As an accomplished musician, Norrman achieved in his work the same rhythm, delicacy and rigor found in the compositions of Schumann and Brahms; the musicians he most admired."

Works by Norrman are included in the collections of the British Museum, London, Nationalmuseum, Stockholm and the Metropolitan Museum of Art, New York City (among others).
