= Nowa Ruda, Lower Silesian Voivodeship =

Town in Lower Silesian Voivodeship, Poland

Nowa Ruda
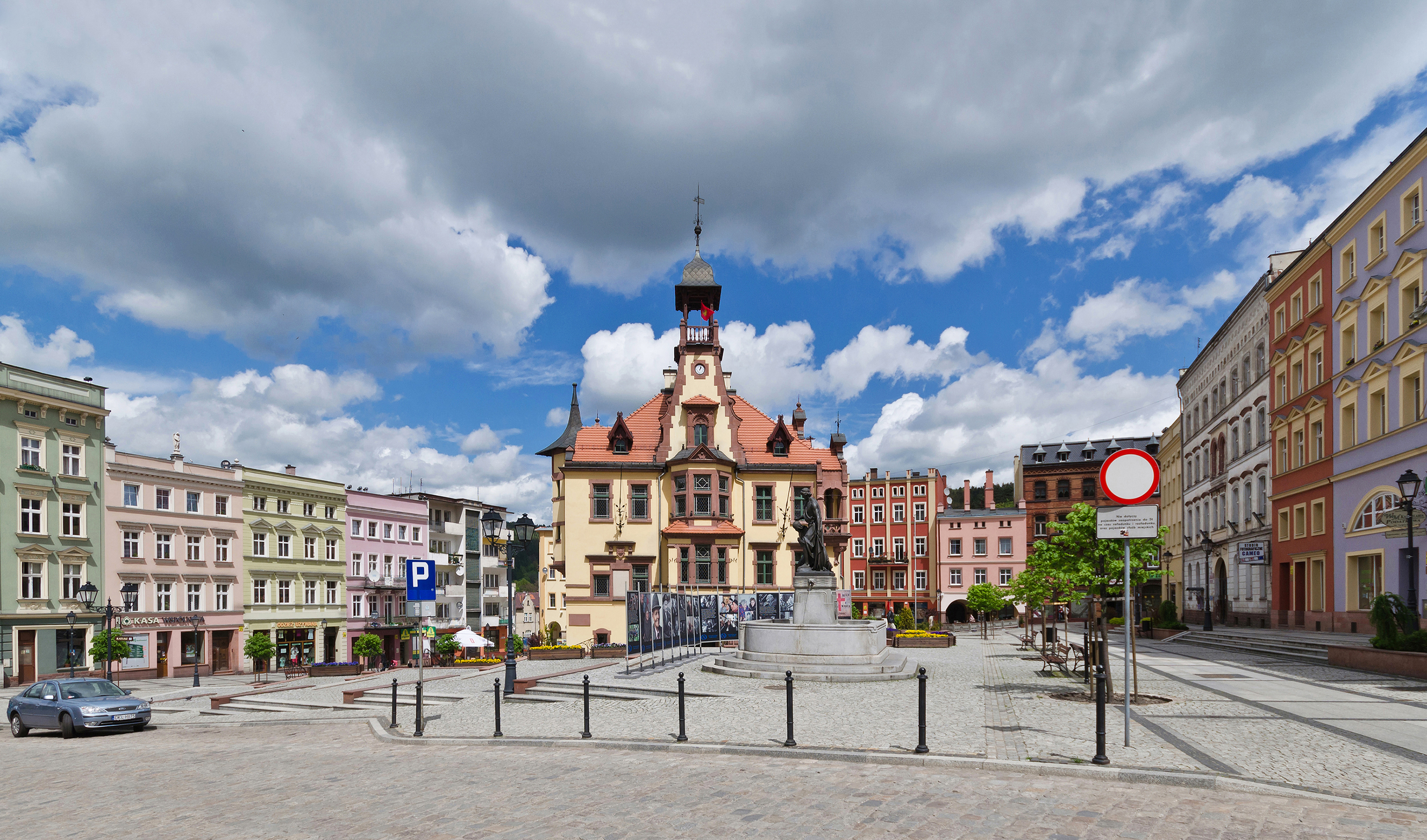
- Market Square and Town Hall in Nowa Ruda

- Flag Coat of arms

- Location within Poland
- Coordinates: 50°34′45″N 16°30′05″E
- Country: Poland
- Voivodeship: Lower Silesian
- County: Kłodzko
- Gmina: Nowa Ruda (urban gmina)
- First mentioned: 1337

Government
  - Mayor: Tomasz Jacek Kiliński

Area
  - Total: 37.04 km^{2} (14.30 sq mi)
- Elevation: 402 m (1,319 ft)

Population (2019-06-30)
  - Total: 22,067
  - Density: 595.8/km^{2} (1,543/sq mi)
- Time zone: UTC+1 (CET)
  - Summer (DST): UTC+2 (CEST)
- Postal code: 57-400
- Car plates: DKL
- Website: www.um.nowaruda.pl

Nowa Ruda [ˈnɔva ˈruda] (Czech: Nová Ruda, German: Neurode) is a town in south-western Poland near the Czech border, lying on the Włodzica river in the central Sudetes mountain range. As of 2019 it had 22,067 inhabitants. The town is located in Kłodzko County, Lower Silesian Voivodeship. It is the seat of the rural district of Gmina Nowa Ruda, but is not part of its territory (the town is a separate urban gmina in its own right).

== History ==
=== Under Polish and Bohemian rule ===
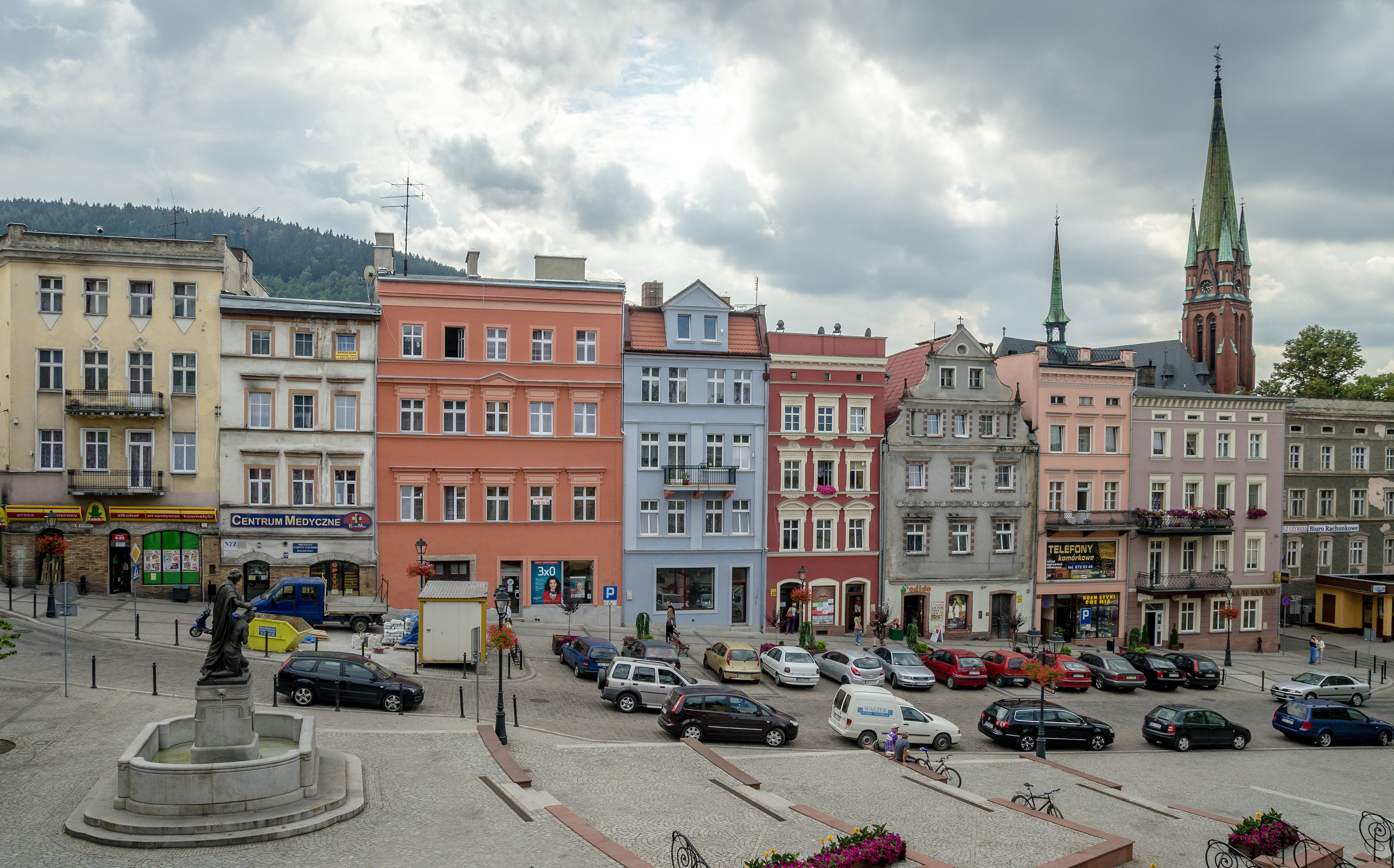
Historic townhouses at the Market Square with the Saint Nicholas church in the background

A medieval village situated in the rich Kłodzko Valley, Nowa Ruda developed in the mid-13th century as part of the Kingdom of Bohemia. German-speaking immigrants settled there as part of the Ostsiedlung. The oldest known mention of the settlement comes from 1337 from a document issued in nearby Kłodzko, when it was part of the Polish Piast-ruled Duchy of Ziębice/Münsterberg under the suzerainty of the Bohemian (Czech) Crown of the Holy Roman Empire. It passed directly to Bohemia in the next decades. Officially, the settlement was granted a city charter in 1363 and received the name of Newenrode. In the Late Middle Ages, weaving, clothmaking and shoemaking developed in the town. In the years 1427-1429 the town was invaded by the Hussites. The city was rechartered under a local variant of the Magdeburg Law in 1434 and then again in 1596. From 1459 it was part of the Bohemian-ruled County of Kladsko. The city was invaded and devastated again during the Thirty Years' War in 1622.

=== Under Prussia and Germany ===
In 1742 it passed to Prussia. In the second half of the 19th century the town developed due to coal mining and the textile industry. In 1884 it suffered a great fire. During World War I, the German government operated three forced labour camps for Allied prisoners of war at local coal mines. After World War I, it suffered an economic crisis. The town was no longer a district seat after 1932, when it was reincorporated into the Landkreis Glatz (Kłodzko district).

During World War II, the Germans established three labour units for French, Belgian and Soviet prisoners of war, as well as two forced labour camps. Also during the war, the largest mining disaster in the town's history took place; 187 miners were killed.

Historic churches of Nowa Ruda

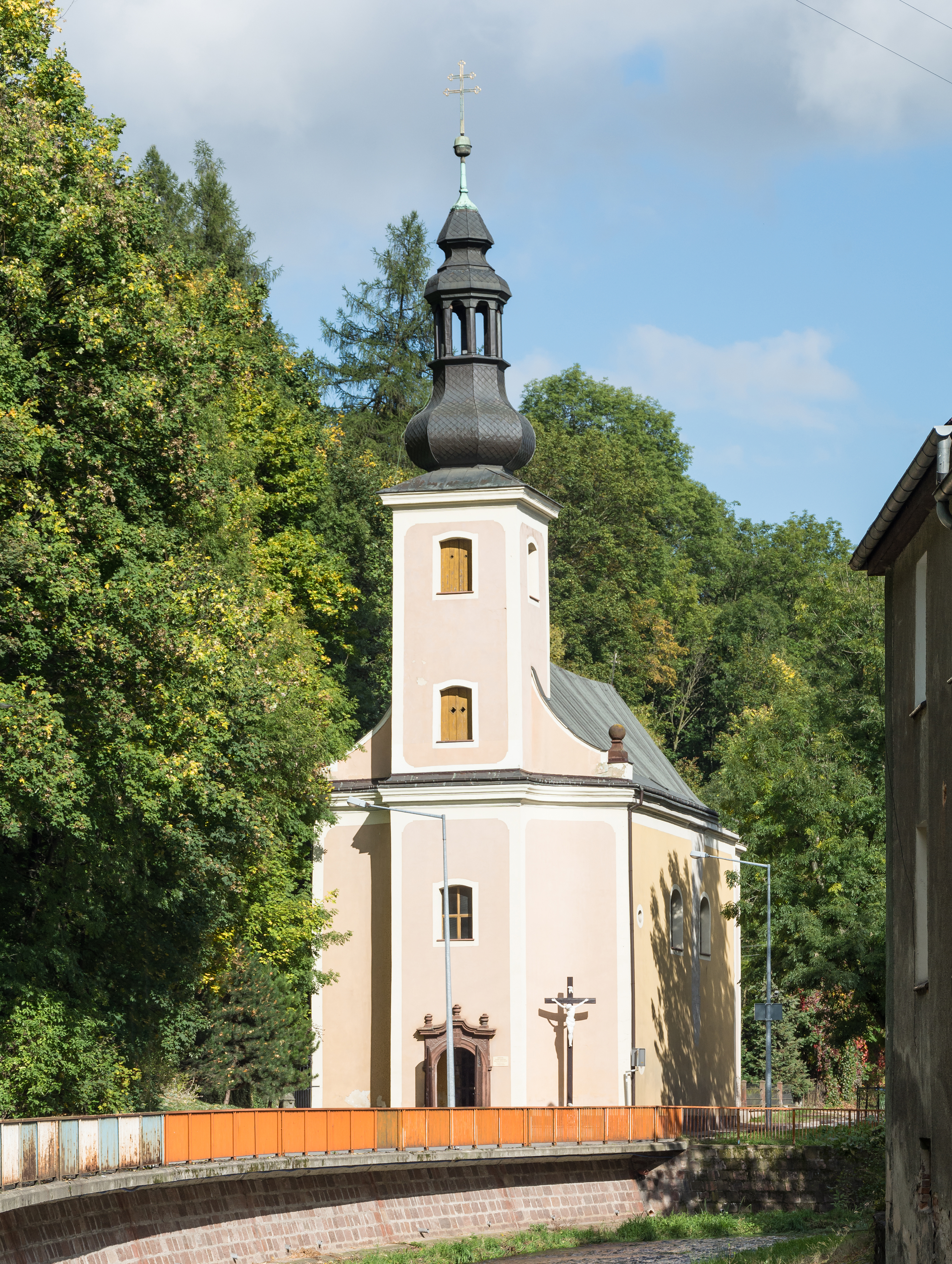
Holy Cross

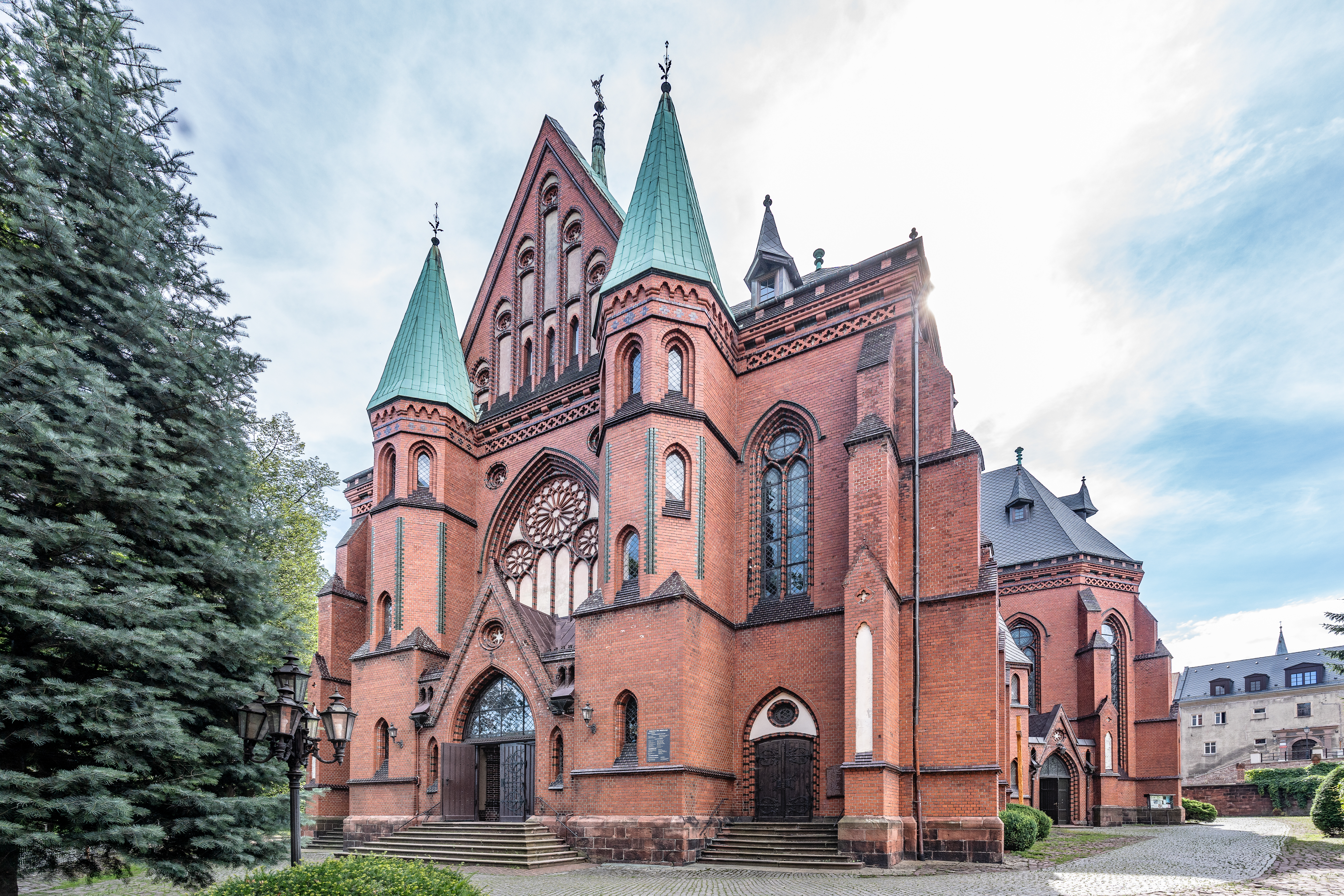
St. Nicholas

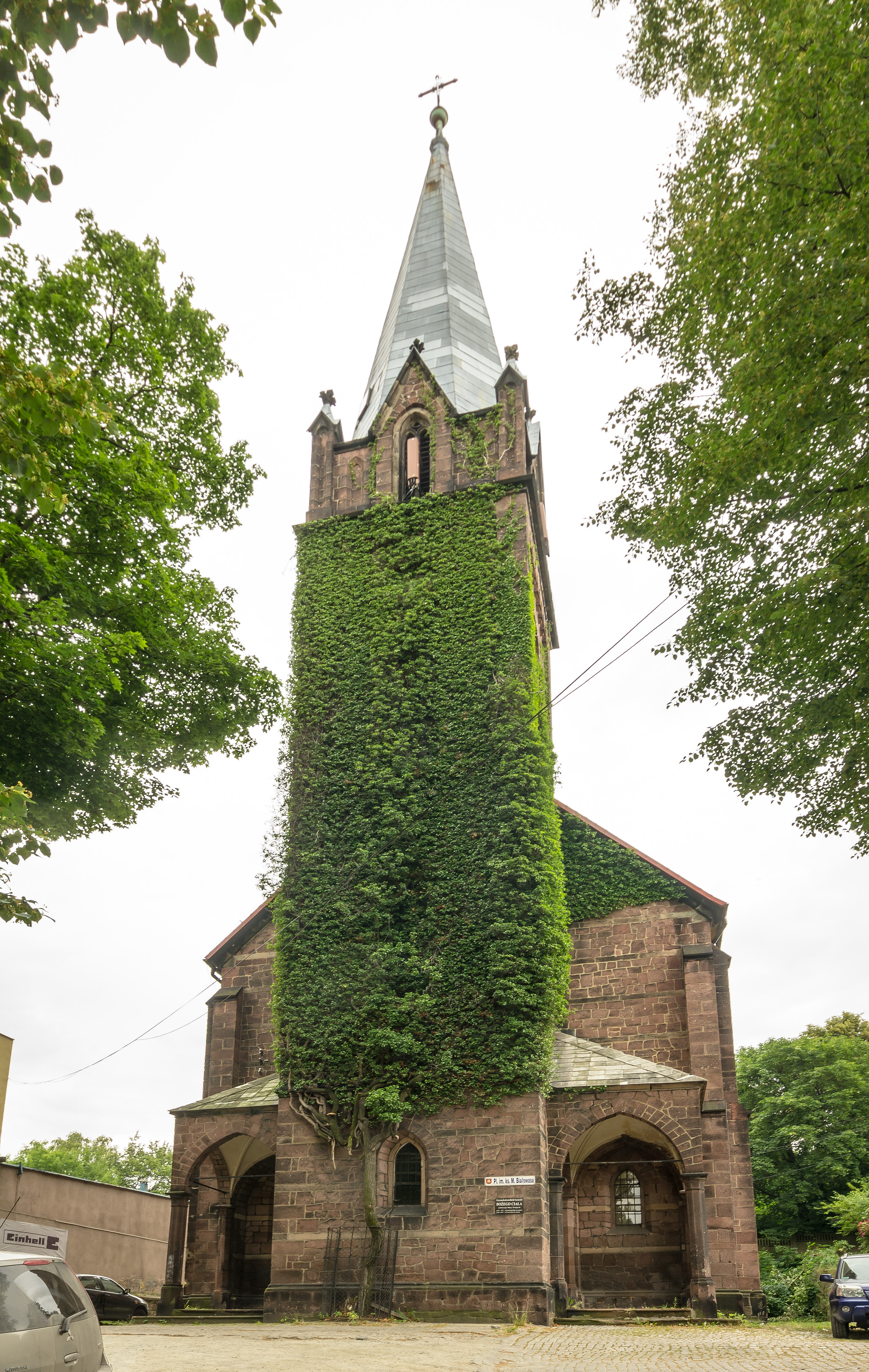
Corpus Christi

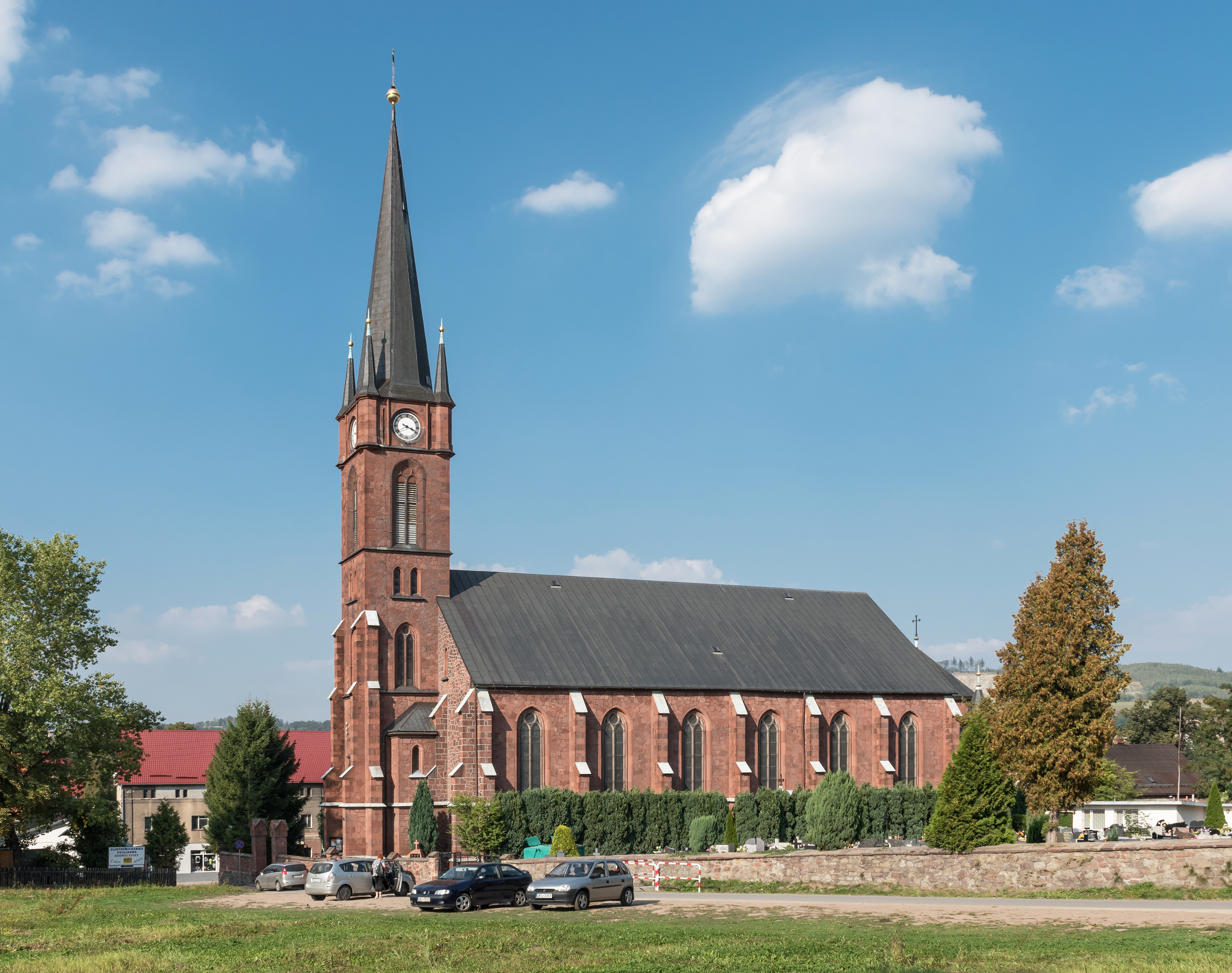
St. Catherine

=== After World War II ===
Following the defeat of Nazi Germany in World War II the region became part of Poland, and the town took on its present name, with the German population being expelled in accordance to the Potsdam Agreement. It was repopulated by Poles, expellees from former eastern Poland annexed by the Soviet Union, settlers from central Poland and miners returning from France. In 1973 the settlement of Słupiec was included within the town limits as a new district. In 1976 and 1979 mining disasters occurred, in which 17 and 7 miners respectively died. After the adoption of Ostpolitik by the German Chancellor Willy Brandt, the former German inhabitants were allowed to travel to their hometowns and tried to establish relations with the current population and the Holy See redrew the boundaries of the ecclesiastical provinces along the post-war borders. On 28 June 1972 the Catholic parishes of Nowa Ruda were transferred from the traditional Hradec Králové diocese (est. 1664; Ecclesiastical Province of Bohemia) to the Archdiocese of Wrocław.

From 1975 to 1998 it was administratively located in the former Wałbrzych Voivodeship.

The area was notable in the Middle Ages as a source of rich iron ore deposits. Until 2000 there was also a coal mine and a gabbro mine in Nowa Ruda's borough of Słupiec.

== Transport ==
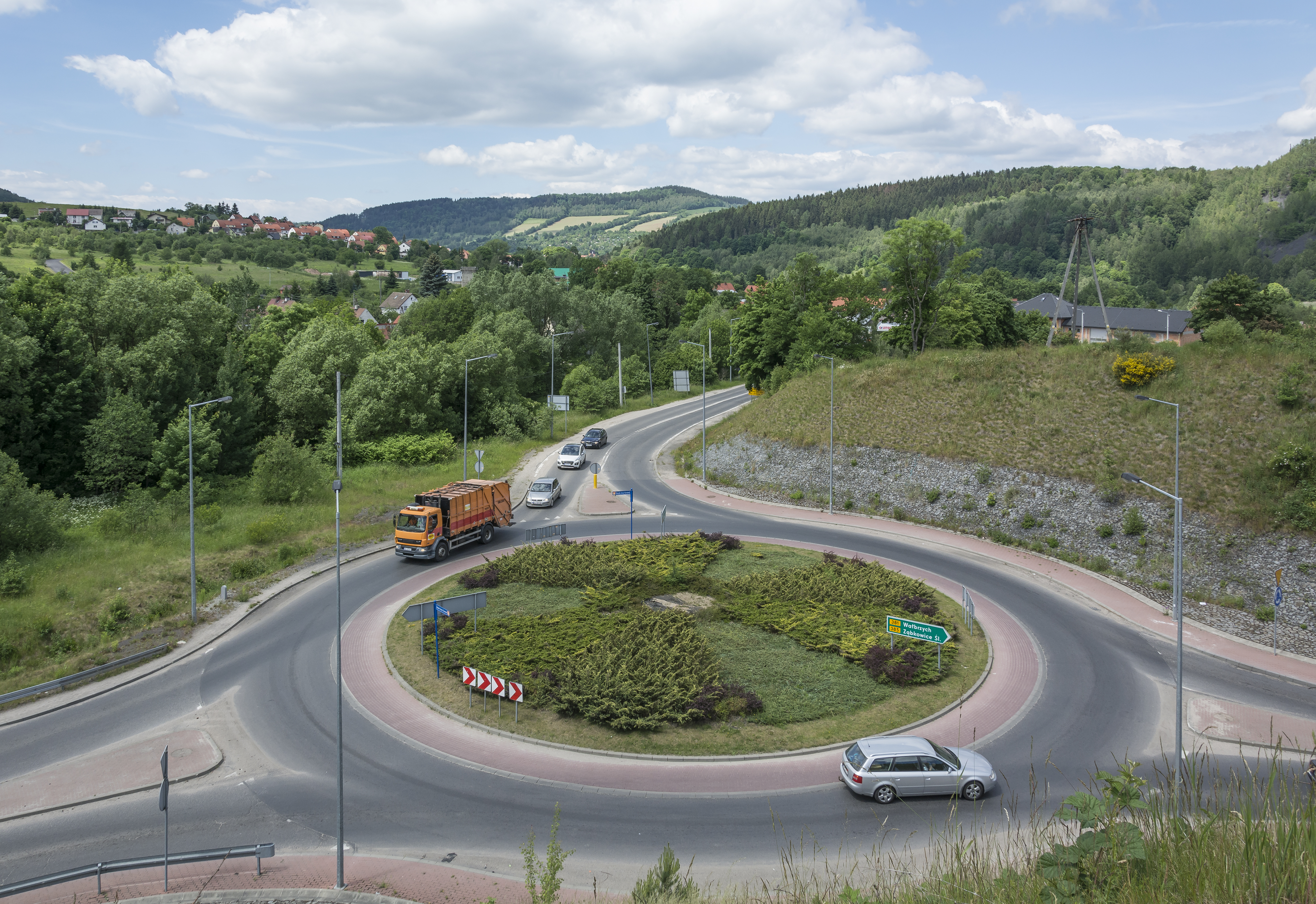
Rondo Wolności (Freedom Roundabout)

There is a train station in Nowa Ruda. The Voivodeship roads 381, 384 and 385 pass through the town.

== Sport ==
Piast Nowa Ruda is the local multi-sports club.

== Culture ==
- The Literary Heights Festival, a Polish literary festival founded in 2015 which takes place in the vicinity of Gmina Nowa Ruda at the foot of the Owl Mountains in the Kłodzko Valley. The event's organizers include the Olga Tokarczuk Foundation, the city and commune of Nowa Ruda, while the hosts are Karol Maliszewski and Olga Tokarczuk. The festival's program includes educational sessions, debates, concerts, panels, shows, meetings, poetry, literary workshops, film screenings, culinary workshops and various exhibitions.
- Nowa Ruda Literary Club Ogma
- Polish-Czech Group of Poets '97.

== Notable people ==
- Franz Eckert (1852–1916), composer
- Joachim von Pfeil (1857–1924), German explorer
- Friedrich Kayßler (1874–1945), actor and writer
- Joseph Wittig (1879–1949), German theologian and writer
- Friedrich-Wilhelm Otte (1898–1944), Wehrmacht general
- Werner Steinberg (1913–1992), writer
- Gero Trauth (born 1942), painter, graphic artist, porcelain illustrator and designer
- Edyta Geppert (born 1953), singer
- Krzysztof Tyniec (born 1956), actor
- Karol Maliszewski (born 1960), poet
- Olga Tokarczuk (born 1962), writer, Nobel laureate
- Robert Więckiewicz (born 1967), actor

== Twin towns – sister cities ==
Nowa Ruda is twinned with:

- Broumov, Czech Republic
- Castrop-Rauxel, Germany
- Wallers, France
